

40001–40100 

|-bgcolor=#fefefe
| 40001 ||  || — || April 21, 1998 || Socorro || LINEAR || — || align=right | 2.3 km || 
|-id=002 bgcolor=#E9E9E9
| 40002 ||  || — || April 21, 1998 || Socorro || LINEAR || WIT || align=right | 2.3 km || 
|-id=003 bgcolor=#d6d6d6
| 40003 ||  || — || April 21, 1998 || Socorro || LINEAR || THM || align=right | 5.6 km || 
|-id=004 bgcolor=#E9E9E9
| 40004 ||  || — || April 21, 1998 || Socorro || LINEAR || — || align=right | 3.6 km || 
|-id=005 bgcolor=#E9E9E9
| 40005 ||  || — || April 21, 1998 || Socorro || LINEAR || MAR || align=right | 2.7 km || 
|-id=006 bgcolor=#E9E9E9
| 40006 ||  || — || April 24, 1998 || Reedy Creek || J. Broughton || — || align=right | 3.8 km || 
|-id=007 bgcolor=#E9E9E9
| 40007 Vieuxtemps ||  ||  || April 25, 1998 || La Silla || E. W. Elst || — || align=right | 6.0 km || 
|-id=008 bgcolor=#fefefe
| 40008 ||  || — || April 23, 1998 || Socorro || LINEAR || V || align=right | 2.1 km || 
|-id=009 bgcolor=#E9E9E9
| 40009 ||  || — || April 23, 1998 || Socorro || LINEAR || — || align=right | 4.0 km || 
|-id=010 bgcolor=#d6d6d6
| 40010 ||  || — || April 23, 1998 || Socorro || LINEAR || — || align=right | 12 km || 
|-id=011 bgcolor=#E9E9E9
| 40011 ||  || — || April 23, 1998 || Socorro || LINEAR || — || align=right | 5.3 km || 
|-id=012 bgcolor=#E9E9E9
| 40012 ||  || — || April 23, 1998 || Socorro || LINEAR || — || align=right | 2.7 km || 
|-id=013 bgcolor=#E9E9E9
| 40013 ||  || — || April 23, 1998 || Socorro || LINEAR || — || align=right | 3.5 km || 
|-id=014 bgcolor=#E9E9E9
| 40014 ||  || — || April 23, 1998 || Socorro || LINEAR || — || align=right | 3.5 km || 
|-id=015 bgcolor=#E9E9E9
| 40015 ||  || — || April 23, 1998 || Socorro || LINEAR || MAR || align=right | 2.8 km || 
|-id=016 bgcolor=#fefefe
| 40016 ||  || — || April 18, 1998 || Socorro || LINEAR || NYS || align=right | 1.6 km || 
|-id=017 bgcolor=#fefefe
| 40017 ||  || — || April 18, 1998 || Socorro || LINEAR || — || align=right | 2.5 km || 
|-id=018 bgcolor=#fefefe
| 40018 ||  || — || April 19, 1998 || Socorro || LINEAR || — || align=right | 2.7 km || 
|-id=019 bgcolor=#fefefe
| 40019 ||  || — || April 20, 1998 || Socorro || LINEAR || — || align=right | 2.2 km || 
|-id=020 bgcolor=#E9E9E9
| 40020 ||  || — || April 20, 1998 || Socorro || LINEAR || — || align=right | 2.8 km || 
|-id=021 bgcolor=#fefefe
| 40021 ||  || — || April 20, 1998 || Socorro || LINEAR || V || align=right | 2.0 km || 
|-id=022 bgcolor=#d6d6d6
| 40022 ||  || — || April 23, 1998 || Socorro || LINEAR || — || align=right | 4.4 km || 
|-id=023 bgcolor=#E9E9E9
| 40023 ANPCEN ||  ||  || April 25, 1998 || La Silla || E. W. Elst || — || align=right | 3.0 km || 
|-id=024 bgcolor=#E9E9E9
| 40024 ||  || — || April 25, 1998 || La Silla || E. W. Elst || — || align=right | 4.4 km || 
|-id=025 bgcolor=#E9E9E9
| 40025 ||  || — || April 25, 1998 || La Silla || E. W. Elst || — || align=right | 3.1 km || 
|-id=026 bgcolor=#fefefe
| 40026 ||  || — || May 1, 1998 || Anderson Mesa || LONEOS || — || align=right | 3.5 km || 
|-id=027 bgcolor=#E9E9E9
| 40027 ||  || — || May 15, 1998 || Woomera || F. B. Zoltowski || HEN || align=right | 3.0 km || 
|-id=028 bgcolor=#fefefe
| 40028 ||  || — || May 18, 1998 || Anderson Mesa || LONEOS || — || align=right | 3.2 km || 
|-id=029 bgcolor=#E9E9E9
| 40029 ||  || — || May 22, 1998 || Socorro || LINEAR || — || align=right | 8.0 km || 
|-id=030 bgcolor=#E9E9E9
| 40030 ||  || — || May 22, 1998 || Socorro || LINEAR || MIT || align=right | 5.1 km || 
|-id=031 bgcolor=#E9E9E9
| 40031 ||  || — || May 22, 1998 || Socorro || LINEAR || HNS || align=right | 4.6 km || 
|-id=032 bgcolor=#fefefe
| 40032 ||  || — || May 26, 1998 || Xinglong || SCAP || — || align=right | 3.2 km || 
|-id=033 bgcolor=#E9E9E9
| 40033 ||  || — || May 22, 1998 || Kitt Peak || Spacewatch || — || align=right | 3.1 km || 
|-id=034 bgcolor=#d6d6d6
| 40034 ||  || — || May 22, 1998 || Kitt Peak || Spacewatch || — || align=right | 6.6 km || 
|-id=035 bgcolor=#E9E9E9
| 40035 ||  || — || May 22, 1998 || Socorro || LINEAR || EUN || align=right | 2.9 km || 
|-id=036 bgcolor=#E9E9E9
| 40036 ||  || — || May 22, 1998 || Socorro || LINEAR || — || align=right | 2.4 km || 
|-id=037 bgcolor=#E9E9E9
| 40037 ||  || — || May 22, 1998 || Socorro || LINEAR || AEO || align=right | 4.0 km || 
|-id=038 bgcolor=#E9E9E9
| 40038 ||  || — || May 22, 1998 || Socorro || LINEAR || — || align=right | 3.1 km || 
|-id=039 bgcolor=#E9E9E9
| 40039 ||  || — || May 21, 1998 || Mallorca || Á. López J., R. Pacheco || MIT || align=right | 6.0 km || 
|-id=040 bgcolor=#E9E9E9
| 40040 ||  || — || May 22, 1998 || Socorro || LINEAR || — || align=right | 3.0 km || 
|-id=041 bgcolor=#E9E9E9
| 40041 ||  || — || May 22, 1998 || Socorro || LINEAR || — || align=right | 2.1 km || 
|-id=042 bgcolor=#E9E9E9
| 40042 ||  || — || May 22, 1998 || Socorro || LINEAR || — || align=right | 3.4 km || 
|-id=043 bgcolor=#E9E9E9
| 40043 ||  || — || May 22, 1998 || Socorro || LINEAR || — || align=right | 4.9 km || 
|-id=044 bgcolor=#E9E9E9
| 40044 ||  || — || May 22, 1998 || Socorro || LINEAR || — || align=right | 2.8 km || 
|-id=045 bgcolor=#E9E9E9
| 40045 ||  || — || May 22, 1998 || Socorro || LINEAR || — || align=right | 3.9 km || 
|-id=046 bgcolor=#E9E9E9
| 40046 ||  || — || May 22, 1998 || Socorro || LINEAR || — || align=right | 6.7 km || 
|-id=047 bgcolor=#E9E9E9
| 40047 ||  || — || May 22, 1998 || Socorro || LINEAR || — || align=right | 1.8 km || 
|-id=048 bgcolor=#E9E9E9
| 40048 ||  || — || May 22, 1998 || Socorro || LINEAR || — || align=right | 11 km || 
|-id=049 bgcolor=#E9E9E9
| 40049 ||  || — || May 22, 1998 || Socorro || LINEAR || — || align=right | 4.2 km || 
|-id=050 bgcolor=#E9E9E9
| 40050 ||  || — || May 22, 1998 || Socorro || LINEAR || — || align=right | 2.8 km || 
|-id=051 bgcolor=#E9E9E9
| 40051 ||  || — || May 22, 1998 || Socorro || LINEAR || — || align=right | 3.7 km || 
|-id=052 bgcolor=#fefefe
| 40052 ||  || — || May 22, 1998 || Socorro || LINEAR || — || align=right | 3.3 km || 
|-id=053 bgcolor=#E9E9E9
| 40053 ||  || — || May 22, 1998 || Socorro || LINEAR || — || align=right | 3.4 km || 
|-id=054 bgcolor=#fefefe
| 40054 ||  || — || May 27, 1998 || Anderson Mesa || LONEOS || — || align=right | 3.8 km || 
|-id=055 bgcolor=#E9E9E9
| 40055 ||  || — || May 24, 1998 || Socorro || LINEAR || — || align=right | 5.1 km || 
|-id=056 bgcolor=#E9E9E9
| 40056 ||  || — || May 22, 1998 || Socorro || LINEAR || — || align=right | 5.0 km || 
|-id=057 bgcolor=#E9E9E9
| 40057 ||  || — || May 22, 1998 || Socorro || LINEAR || — || align=right | 4.9 km || 
|-id=058 bgcolor=#fefefe
| 40058 ||  || — || May 22, 1998 || Socorro || LINEAR || ERI || align=right | 5.7 km || 
|-id=059 bgcolor=#E9E9E9
| 40059 ||  || — || May 22, 1998 || Socorro || LINEAR || — || align=right | 5.0 km || 
|-id=060 bgcolor=#fefefe
| 40060 ||  || — || May 22, 1998 || Socorro || LINEAR || — || align=right | 3.1 km || 
|-id=061 bgcolor=#E9E9E9
| 40061 ||  || — || May 22, 1998 || Socorro || LINEAR || — || align=right | 3.9 km || 
|-id=062 bgcolor=#E9E9E9
| 40062 ||  || — || May 23, 1998 || Socorro || LINEAR || — || align=right | 4.8 km || 
|-id=063 bgcolor=#E9E9E9
| 40063 ||  || — || May 23, 1998 || Socorro || LINEAR || — || align=right | 3.3 km || 
|-id=064 bgcolor=#E9E9E9
| 40064 ||  || — || May 23, 1998 || Socorro || LINEAR || — || align=right | 9.4 km || 
|-id=065 bgcolor=#E9E9E9
| 40065 ||  || — || May 23, 1998 || Socorro || LINEAR || — || align=right | 3.8 km || 
|-id=066 bgcolor=#E9E9E9
| 40066 ||  || — || May 23, 1998 || Socorro || LINEAR || — || align=right | 5.0 km || 
|-id=067 bgcolor=#E9E9E9
| 40067 ||  || — || May 23, 1998 || Socorro || LINEAR || — || align=right | 5.0 km || 
|-id=068 bgcolor=#E9E9E9
| 40068 ||  || — || May 23, 1998 || Socorro || LINEAR || — || align=right | 3.2 km || 
|-id=069 bgcolor=#E9E9E9
| 40069 ||  || — || May 23, 1998 || Socorro || LINEAR || — || align=right | 2.9 km || 
|-id=070 bgcolor=#E9E9E9
| 40070 ||  || — || May 26, 1998 || Socorro || LINEAR || MAR || align=right | 3.3 km || 
|-id=071 bgcolor=#E9E9E9
| 40071 ||  || — || May 23, 1998 || Socorro || LINEAR || — || align=right | 2.3 km || 
|-id=072 bgcolor=#E9E9E9
| 40072 ||  || — || May 23, 1998 || Socorro || LINEAR || — || align=right | 2.7 km || 
|-id=073 bgcolor=#fefefe
| 40073 ||  || — || May 23, 1998 || Socorro || LINEAR || — || align=right | 3.2 km || 
|-id=074 bgcolor=#E9E9E9
| 40074 ||  || — || May 22, 1998 || Socorro || LINEAR || — || align=right | 4.2 km || 
|-id=075 bgcolor=#E9E9E9
| 40075 ||  || — || May 22, 1998 || Socorro || LINEAR || — || align=right | 3.6 km || 
|-id=076 bgcolor=#E9E9E9
| 40076 || 1998 LB || — || June 2, 1998 || Anderson Mesa || LONEOS || MAR || align=right | 3.1 km || 
|-id=077 bgcolor=#E9E9E9
| 40077 ||  || — || June 19, 1998 || Kitt Peak || Spacewatch || ADE || align=right | 3.0 km || 
|-id=078 bgcolor=#E9E9E9
| 40078 ||  || — || June 19, 1998 || Socorro || LINEAR || MIT || align=right | 5.7 km || 
|-id=079 bgcolor=#E9E9E9
| 40079 ||  || — || June 19, 1998 || Socorro || LINEAR || EUN || align=right | 5.1 km || 
|-id=080 bgcolor=#E9E9E9
| 40080 ||  || — || June 19, 1998 || Socorro || LINEAR || WAT || align=right | 7.5 km || 
|-id=081 bgcolor=#E9E9E9
| 40081 Rault ||  ||  || June 25, 1998 || Caussols || ODAS || MAR || align=right | 3.8 km || 
|-id=082 bgcolor=#d6d6d6
| 40082 ||  || — || June 27, 1998 || Kitt Peak || Spacewatch || — || align=right | 6.6 km || 
|-id=083 bgcolor=#E9E9E9
| 40083 ||  || — || June 19, 1998 || Caussols || ODAS || — || align=right | 3.2 km || 
|-id=084 bgcolor=#E9E9E9
| 40084 ||  || — || June 24, 1998 || Socorro || LINEAR || — || align=right | 4.7 km || 
|-id=085 bgcolor=#fefefe
| 40085 ||  || — || June 24, 1998 || Socorro || LINEAR || — || align=right | 2.5 km || 
|-id=086 bgcolor=#E9E9E9
| 40086 ||  || — || June 24, 1998 || Socorro || LINEAR || — || align=right | 8.2 km || 
|-id=087 bgcolor=#E9E9E9
| 40087 ||  || — || June 24, 1998 || Socorro || LINEAR || EUN || align=right | 3.6 km || 
|-id=088 bgcolor=#E9E9E9
| 40088 ||  || — || June 23, 1998 || Anderson Mesa || LONEOS || — || align=right | 4.4 km || 
|-id=089 bgcolor=#d6d6d6
| 40089 ||  || — || June 26, 1998 || La Silla || E. W. Elst || — || align=right | 5.0 km || 
|-id=090 bgcolor=#d6d6d6
| 40090 ||  || — || June 28, 1998 || La Silla || E. W. Elst || — || align=right | 6.4 km || 
|-id=091 bgcolor=#E9E9E9
| 40091 ||  || — || June 28, 1998 || La Silla || E. W. Elst || — || align=right | 5.9 km || 
|-id=092 bgcolor=#E9E9E9
| 40092 Memel ||  ||  || June 28, 1998 || La Silla || E. W. Elst || GEF || align=right | 3.2 km || 
|-id=093 bgcolor=#E9E9E9
| 40093 || 1998 NH || — || July 15, 1998 || Prescott || P. G. Comba || — || align=right | 4.5 km || 
|-id=094 bgcolor=#E9E9E9
| 40094 || 1998 NN || — || July 15, 1998 || Anderson Mesa || LONEOS || — || align=right | 3.7 km || 
|-id=095 bgcolor=#E9E9E9
| 40095 ||  || — || July 29, 1998 || Višnjan Observatory || Višnjan Obs. || — || align=right | 7.4 km || 
|-id=096 bgcolor=#d6d6d6
| 40096 ||  || — || July 26, 1998 || La Silla || E. W. Elst || — || align=right | 8.7 km || 
|-id=097 bgcolor=#d6d6d6
| 40097 ||  || — || July 26, 1998 || La Silla || E. W. Elst || — || align=right | 13 km || 
|-id=098 bgcolor=#d6d6d6
| 40098 ||  || — || July 26, 1998 || La Silla || E. W. Elst || — || align=right | 5.9 km || 
|-id=099 bgcolor=#d6d6d6
| 40099 ||  || — || July 26, 1998 || La Silla || E. W. Elst || — || align=right | 5.4 km || 
|-id=100 bgcolor=#E9E9E9
| 40100 || 1998 PV || — || August 12, 1998 || Woomera || F. B. Zoltowski || — || align=right | 4.4 km || 
|}

40101–40200 

|-bgcolor=#E9E9E9
| 40101 || 1998 QX || — || August 19, 1998 || Haleakala || NEAT || PAL || align=right | 5.1 km || 
|-id=102 bgcolor=#E9E9E9
| 40102 ||  || — || August 19, 1998 || Haleakala || NEAT || — || align=right | 4.1 km || 
|-id=103 bgcolor=#d6d6d6
| 40103 ||  || — || August 17, 1998 || Višnjan Observatory || Višnjan Obs. || — || align=right | 11 km || 
|-id=104 bgcolor=#d6d6d6
| 40104 ||  || — || August 17, 1998 || Reedy Creek || J. Broughton || EOS || align=right | 8.8 km || 
|-id=105 bgcolor=#d6d6d6
| 40105 ||  || — || August 17, 1998 || Woomera || F. B. Zoltowski || KOR || align=right | 3.8 km || 
|-id=106 bgcolor=#d6d6d6
| 40106 Erben ||  ||  || August 20, 1998 || Ondřejov || P. Pravec || — || align=right | 4.8 km || 
|-id=107 bgcolor=#d6d6d6
| 40107 ||  || — || August 17, 1998 || Socorro || LINEAR || — || align=right | 3.9 km || 
|-id=108 bgcolor=#d6d6d6
| 40108 ||  || — || August 17, 1998 || Socorro || LINEAR || — || align=right | 10 km || 
|-id=109 bgcolor=#E9E9E9
| 40109 ||  || — || August 17, 1998 || Socorro || LINEAR || — || align=right | 6.6 km || 
|-id=110 bgcolor=#d6d6d6
| 40110 ||  || — || August 17, 1998 || Socorro || LINEAR || — || align=right | 8.0 km || 
|-id=111 bgcolor=#d6d6d6
| 40111 ||  || — || August 17, 1998 || Socorro || LINEAR || EOS || align=right | 5.6 km || 
|-id=112 bgcolor=#E9E9E9
| 40112 ||  || — || August 17, 1998 || Socorro || LINEAR || — || align=right | 3.5 km || 
|-id=113 bgcolor=#E9E9E9
| 40113 ||  || — || August 17, 1998 || Socorro || LINEAR || — || align=right | 6.1 km || 
|-id=114 bgcolor=#E9E9E9
| 40114 ||  || — || August 17, 1998 || Socorro || LINEAR || GEF || align=right | 3.9 km || 
|-id=115 bgcolor=#d6d6d6
| 40115 ||  || — || August 17, 1998 || Socorro || LINEAR || EOS || align=right | 7.0 km || 
|-id=116 bgcolor=#d6d6d6
| 40116 ||  || — || August 17, 1998 || Socorro || LINEAR || EOS || align=right | 4.8 km || 
|-id=117 bgcolor=#d6d6d6
| 40117 ||  || — || August 17, 1998 || Socorro || LINEAR || THM || align=right | 6.3 km || 
|-id=118 bgcolor=#d6d6d6
| 40118 ||  || — || August 17, 1998 || Socorro || LINEAR || — || align=right | 8.9 km || 
|-id=119 bgcolor=#d6d6d6
| 40119 ||  || — || August 17, 1998 || Socorro || LINEAR || HYG || align=right | 8.8 km || 
|-id=120 bgcolor=#d6d6d6
| 40120 ||  || — || August 17, 1998 || Socorro || LINEAR || EOS || align=right | 11 km || 
|-id=121 bgcolor=#d6d6d6
| 40121 ||  || — || August 18, 1998 || Reedy Creek || J. Broughton || — || align=right | 8.1 km || 
|-id=122 bgcolor=#d6d6d6
| 40122 ||  || — || August 17, 1998 || Socorro || LINEAR || THM || align=right | 5.6 km || 
|-id=123 bgcolor=#d6d6d6
| 40123 ||  || — || August 17, 1998 || Socorro || LINEAR || — || align=right | 14 km || 
|-id=124 bgcolor=#d6d6d6
| 40124 ||  || — || August 17, 1998 || Socorro || LINEAR || KOR || align=right | 5.0 km || 
|-id=125 bgcolor=#d6d6d6
| 40125 ||  || — || August 17, 1998 || Socorro || LINEAR || EOS || align=right | 4.9 km || 
|-id=126 bgcolor=#E9E9E9
| 40126 ||  || — || August 17, 1998 || Socorro || LINEAR || — || align=right | 3.4 km || 
|-id=127 bgcolor=#d6d6d6
| 40127 ||  || — || August 17, 1998 || Socorro || LINEAR || — || align=right | 9.8 km || 
|-id=128 bgcolor=#d6d6d6
| 40128 ||  || — || August 17, 1998 || Socorro || LINEAR || — || align=right | 11 km || 
|-id=129 bgcolor=#d6d6d6
| 40129 ||  || — || August 17, 1998 || Socorro || LINEAR || — || align=right | 6.6 km || 
|-id=130 bgcolor=#d6d6d6
| 40130 ||  || — || August 17, 1998 || Socorro || LINEAR || — || align=right | 6.7 km || 
|-id=131 bgcolor=#d6d6d6
| 40131 ||  || — || August 17, 1998 || Socorro || LINEAR || — || align=right | 9.1 km || 
|-id=132 bgcolor=#d6d6d6
| 40132 ||  || — || August 17, 1998 || Socorro || LINEAR || HYG || align=right | 9.5 km || 
|-id=133 bgcolor=#d6d6d6
| 40133 ||  || — || August 20, 1998 || Anderson Mesa || LONEOS || — || align=right | 10 km || 
|-id=134 bgcolor=#E9E9E9
| 40134 Marsili ||  ||  || August 27, 1998 || Colleverde || V. S. Casulli || — || align=right | 4.3 km || 
|-id=135 bgcolor=#d6d6d6
| 40135 ||  || — || August 26, 1998 || Farra d'Isonzo || Farra d'Isonzo || EOS || align=right | 5.0 km || 
|-id=136 bgcolor=#d6d6d6
| 40136 ||  || — || August 30, 1998 || Kitt Peak || Spacewatch || THM || align=right | 6.3 km || 
|-id=137 bgcolor=#E9E9E9
| 40137 ||  || — || August 28, 1998 || Ondřejov || L. Kotková || ADE || align=right | 11 km || 
|-id=138 bgcolor=#d6d6d6
| 40138 ||  || — || August 30, 1998 || Xinglong || SCAP || EOS || align=right | 4.4 km || 
|-id=139 bgcolor=#E9E9E9
| 40139 ||  || — || August 24, 1998 || Socorro || LINEAR || MAR || align=right | 4.5 km || 
|-id=140 bgcolor=#d6d6d6
| 40140 ||  || — || August 24, 1998 || Socorro || LINEAR || TIR || align=right | 7.9 km || 
|-id=141 bgcolor=#d6d6d6
| 40141 ||  || — || August 24, 1998 || Socorro || LINEAR || ALA || align=right | 7.1 km || 
|-id=142 bgcolor=#d6d6d6
| 40142 ||  || — || August 24, 1998 || Socorro || LINEAR || — || align=right | 9.4 km || 
|-id=143 bgcolor=#d6d6d6
| 40143 ||  || — || August 24, 1998 || Socorro || LINEAR || — || align=right | 13 km || 
|-id=144 bgcolor=#d6d6d6
| 40144 ||  || — || August 24, 1998 || Socorro || LINEAR || — || align=right | 9.4 km || 
|-id=145 bgcolor=#d6d6d6
| 40145 ||  || — || August 24, 1998 || Socorro || LINEAR || — || align=right | 5.8 km || 
|-id=146 bgcolor=#d6d6d6
| 40146 ||  || — || August 24, 1998 || Socorro || LINEAR || — || align=right | 9.2 km || 
|-id=147 bgcolor=#d6d6d6
| 40147 ||  || — || August 24, 1998 || Socorro || LINEAR || — || align=right | 14 km || 
|-id=148 bgcolor=#d6d6d6
| 40148 ||  || — || August 24, 1998 || Socorro || LINEAR || — || align=right | 9.3 km || 
|-id=149 bgcolor=#d6d6d6
| 40149 ||  || — || August 24, 1998 || Socorro || LINEAR || EOS || align=right | 5.8 km || 
|-id=150 bgcolor=#d6d6d6
| 40150 ||  || — || August 24, 1998 || Socorro || LINEAR || MEL || align=right | 12 km || 
|-id=151 bgcolor=#d6d6d6
| 40151 ||  || — || August 24, 1998 || Socorro || LINEAR || — || align=right | 6.4 km || 
|-id=152 bgcolor=#d6d6d6
| 40152 ||  || — || August 24, 1998 || Socorro || LINEAR || EOS || align=right | 6.8 km || 
|-id=153 bgcolor=#d6d6d6
| 40153 ||  || — || August 24, 1998 || Socorro || LINEAR || — || align=right | 9.6 km || 
|-id=154 bgcolor=#d6d6d6
| 40154 ||  || — || August 24, 1998 || Socorro || LINEAR || — || align=right | 7.5 km || 
|-id=155 bgcolor=#d6d6d6
| 40155 ||  || — || August 24, 1998 || Socorro || LINEAR || — || align=right | 7.6 km || 
|-id=156 bgcolor=#d6d6d6
| 40156 ||  || — || August 24, 1998 || Socorro || LINEAR || URS || align=right | 5.9 km || 
|-id=157 bgcolor=#d6d6d6
| 40157 ||  || — || August 24, 1998 || Socorro || LINEAR || EOS || align=right | 8.4 km || 
|-id=158 bgcolor=#d6d6d6
| 40158 ||  || — || August 24, 1998 || Socorro || LINEAR || — || align=right | 7.7 km || 
|-id=159 bgcolor=#d6d6d6
| 40159 ||  || — || August 24, 1998 || Socorro || LINEAR || — || align=right | 5.4 km || 
|-id=160 bgcolor=#fefefe
| 40160 ||  || — || August 28, 1998 || Socorro || LINEAR || H || align=right | 1.7 km || 
|-id=161 bgcolor=#E9E9E9
| 40161 ||  || — || August 28, 1998 || Socorro || LINEAR || EUN || align=right | 5.2 km || 
|-id=162 bgcolor=#d6d6d6
| 40162 ||  || — || August 19, 1998 || Socorro || LINEAR || EOS || align=right | 7.1 km || 
|-id=163 bgcolor=#d6d6d6
| 40163 ||  || — || August 19, 1998 || Socorro || LINEAR || EOS || align=right | 4.3 km || 
|-id=164 bgcolor=#d6d6d6
| 40164 ||  || — || August 26, 1998 || La Silla || E. W. Elst || — || align=right | 5.5 km || 
|-id=165 bgcolor=#d6d6d6
| 40165 ||  || — || August 26, 1998 || La Silla || E. W. Elst || EOS || align=right | 9.8 km || 
|-id=166 bgcolor=#d6d6d6
| 40166 ||  || — || August 26, 1998 || La Silla || E. W. Elst || — || align=right | 8.1 km || 
|-id=167 bgcolor=#d6d6d6
| 40167 ||  || — || August 26, 1998 || La Silla || E. W. Elst || — || align=right | 9.0 km || 
|-id=168 bgcolor=#d6d6d6
| 40168 ||  || — || August 26, 1998 || La Silla || E. W. Elst || — || align=right | 8.2 km || 
|-id=169 bgcolor=#d6d6d6
| 40169 ||  || — || August 25, 1998 || La Silla || E. W. Elst || — || align=right | 8.4 km || 
|-id=170 bgcolor=#d6d6d6
| 40170 || 1998 RK || — || September 1, 1998 || Woomera || F. B. Zoltowski || ALA || align=right | 8.5 km || 
|-id=171 bgcolor=#d6d6d6
| 40171 || 1998 RS || — || September 11, 1998 || Zeno || T. Stafford || URS || align=right | 10 km || 
|-id=172 bgcolor=#d6d6d6
| 40172 ||  || — || September 15, 1998 || Anderson Mesa || LONEOS || — || align=right | 7.7 km || 
|-id=173 bgcolor=#d6d6d6
| 40173 ||  || — || September 12, 1998 || Kitt Peak || Spacewatch || KOR || align=right | 4.1 km || 
|-id=174 bgcolor=#d6d6d6
| 40174 ||  || — || September 14, 1998 || Kitt Peak || Spacewatch || URS || align=right | 8.8 km || 
|-id=175 bgcolor=#d6d6d6
| 40175 ||  || — || September 14, 1998 || Xinglong || SCAP || — || align=right | 9.6 km || 
|-id=176 bgcolor=#d6d6d6
| 40176 ||  || — || September 14, 1998 || Socorro || LINEAR || EOS || align=right | 6.2 km || 
|-id=177 bgcolor=#d6d6d6
| 40177 ||  || — || September 14, 1998 || Socorro || LINEAR || THM || align=right | 7.3 km || 
|-id=178 bgcolor=#d6d6d6
| 40178 ||  || — || September 14, 1998 || Socorro || LINEAR || — || align=right | 8.3 km || 
|-id=179 bgcolor=#d6d6d6
| 40179 ||  || — || September 14, 1998 || Socorro || LINEAR || EOS || align=right | 5.1 km || 
|-id=180 bgcolor=#d6d6d6
| 40180 ||  || — || September 14, 1998 || Socorro || LINEAR || — || align=right | 6.3 km || 
|-id=181 bgcolor=#d6d6d6
| 40181 ||  || — || September 14, 1998 || Socorro || LINEAR || — || align=right | 6.8 km || 
|-id=182 bgcolor=#fefefe
| 40182 ||  || — || September 14, 1998 || Socorro || LINEAR || FLO || align=right | 2.6 km || 
|-id=183 bgcolor=#d6d6d6
| 40183 ||  || — || September 14, 1998 || Socorro || LINEAR || — || align=right | 5.3 km || 
|-id=184 bgcolor=#d6d6d6
| 40184 ||  || — || September 14, 1998 || Socorro || LINEAR || — || align=right | 13 km || 
|-id=185 bgcolor=#d6d6d6
| 40185 ||  || — || September 14, 1998 || Socorro || LINEAR || EOS || align=right | 5.5 km || 
|-id=186 bgcolor=#d6d6d6
| 40186 ||  || — || September 14, 1998 || Socorro || LINEAR || — || align=right | 5.9 km || 
|-id=187 bgcolor=#d6d6d6
| 40187 ||  || — || September 14, 1998 || Socorro || LINEAR || 7:4 || align=right | 12 km || 
|-id=188 bgcolor=#d6d6d6
| 40188 ||  || — || September 14, 1998 || Socorro || LINEAR || — || align=right | 7.8 km || 
|-id=189 bgcolor=#d6d6d6
| 40189 ||  || — || September 14, 1998 || Socorro || LINEAR || — || align=right | 7.9 km || 
|-id=190 bgcolor=#d6d6d6
| 40190 ||  || — || September 14, 1998 || Socorro || LINEAR || HYG || align=right | 8.0 km || 
|-id=191 bgcolor=#d6d6d6
| 40191 ||  || — || September 14, 1998 || Socorro || LINEAR || — || align=right | 11 km || 
|-id=192 bgcolor=#d6d6d6
| 40192 ||  || — || September 14, 1998 || Socorro || LINEAR || — || align=right | 4.6 km || 
|-id=193 bgcolor=#d6d6d6
| 40193 ||  || — || September 14, 1998 || Socorro || LINEAR || — || align=right | 12 km || 
|-id=194 bgcolor=#d6d6d6
| 40194 ||  || — || September 14, 1998 || Socorro || LINEAR || — || align=right | 5.7 km || 
|-id=195 bgcolor=#d6d6d6
| 40195 ||  || — || September 14, 1998 || Socorro || LINEAR || HYG || align=right | 10 km || 
|-id=196 bgcolor=#d6d6d6
| 40196 ||  || — || September 14, 1998 || Socorro || LINEAR || — || align=right | 12 km || 
|-id=197 bgcolor=#d6d6d6
| 40197 ||  || — || September 14, 1998 || Socorro || LINEAR || VER || align=right | 15 km || 
|-id=198 bgcolor=#d6d6d6
| 40198 Azarkhalatbari ||  ||  || September 16, 1998 || Caussols || ODAS || THM || align=right | 8.6 km || 
|-id=199 bgcolor=#d6d6d6
| 40199 ||  || — || September 16, 1998 || Caussols || ODAS || EOS || align=right | 5.6 km || 
|-id=200 bgcolor=#d6d6d6
| 40200 ||  || — || September 18, 1998 || Višnjan Observatory || Višnjan Obs. || — || align=right | 8.3 km || 
|}

40201–40300 

|-bgcolor=#d6d6d6
| 40201 Besely ||  ||  || September 21, 1998 || Caussols || ODAS || — || align=right | 9.6 km || 
|-id=202 bgcolor=#d6d6d6
| 40202 ||  || — || September 24, 1998 || Kleť || Kleť Obs. || — || align=right | 9.0 km || 
|-id=203 bgcolor=#fefefe
| 40203 ||  || — || September 24, 1998 || Catalina || CSS || H || align=right | 1.2 km || 
|-id=204 bgcolor=#d6d6d6
| 40204 ||  || — || September 23, 1998 || Goodricke-Pigott || R. A. Tucker || — || align=right | 11 km || 
|-id=205 bgcolor=#d6d6d6
| 40205 ||  || — || September 19, 1998 || Kitt Peak || Spacewatch || — || align=right | 7.3 km || 
|-id=206 bgcolor=#d6d6d6
| 40206 Lhenice ||  ||  || September 26, 1998 || Kleť || J. Tichá, M. Tichý || — || align=right | 7.4 km || 
|-id=207 bgcolor=#d6d6d6
| 40207 ||  || — || September 23, 1998 || Kitt Peak || Spacewatch || — || align=right | 17 km || 
|-id=208 bgcolor=#d6d6d6
| 40208 ||  || — || September 16, 1998 || Anderson Mesa || LONEOS || — || align=right | 11 km || 
|-id=209 bgcolor=#d6d6d6
| 40209 Morrispodolak ||  ||  || September 16, 1998 || Anderson Mesa || LONEOS || HYG || align=right | 8.0 km || 
|-id=210 bgcolor=#d6d6d6
| 40210 Peixinho ||  ||  || September 16, 1998 || Anderson Mesa || LONEOS || EMA || align=right | 10 km || 
|-id=211 bgcolor=#d6d6d6
| 40211 ||  || — || September 17, 1998 || Anderson Mesa || LONEOS || — || align=right | 6.9 km || 
|-id=212 bgcolor=#d6d6d6
| 40212 ||  || — || September 17, 1998 || Anderson Mesa || LONEOS || ALA || align=right | 8.3 km || 
|-id=213 bgcolor=#d6d6d6
| 40213 ||  || — || September 17, 1998 || Anderson Mesa || LONEOS || — || align=right | 13 km || 
|-id=214 bgcolor=#d6d6d6
| 40214 ||  || — || September 29, 1998 || Xinglong || SCAP || — || align=right | 6.0 km || 
|-id=215 bgcolor=#d6d6d6
| 40215 ||  || — || September 21, 1998 || Socorro || LINEAR || — || align=right | 9.0 km || 
|-id=216 bgcolor=#d6d6d6
| 40216 ||  || — || September 26, 1998 || Socorro || LINEAR || EOS || align=right | 5.7 km || 
|-id=217 bgcolor=#d6d6d6
| 40217 ||  || — || September 26, 1998 || Socorro || LINEAR || — || align=right | 8.6 km || 
|-id=218 bgcolor=#d6d6d6
| 40218 ||  || — || September 26, 1998 || Socorro || LINEAR || URS || align=right | 9.6 km || 
|-id=219 bgcolor=#d6d6d6
| 40219 ||  || — || September 26, 1998 || Socorro || LINEAR || — || align=right | 11 km || 
|-id=220 bgcolor=#d6d6d6
| 40220 ||  || — || September 26, 1998 || Socorro || LINEAR || — || align=right | 9.4 km || 
|-id=221 bgcolor=#d6d6d6
| 40221 ||  || — || September 26, 1998 || Socorro || LINEAR || — || align=right | 12 km || 
|-id=222 bgcolor=#d6d6d6
| 40222 ||  || — || September 26, 1998 || Socorro || LINEAR || — || align=right | 7.1 km || 
|-id=223 bgcolor=#d6d6d6
| 40223 ||  || — || September 26, 1998 || Socorro || LINEAR || AEG || align=right | 12 km || 
|-id=224 bgcolor=#d6d6d6
| 40224 ||  || — || September 23, 1998 || Caussols || ODAS || EOS || align=right | 4.5 km || 
|-id=225 bgcolor=#d6d6d6
| 40225 ||  || — || September 20, 1998 || La Silla || E. W. Elst || THM || align=right | 6.6 km || 
|-id=226 bgcolor=#d6d6d6
| 40226 ||  || — || September 20, 1998 || La Silla || E. W. Elst || MEL || align=right | 11 km || 
|-id=227 bgcolor=#d6d6d6
| 40227 Tahiti ||  ||  || September 20, 1998 || La Silla || E. W. Elst || HIL3:2 || align=right | 17 km || 
|-id=228 bgcolor=#E9E9E9
| 40228 ||  || — || October 12, 1998 || Reedy Creek || J. Broughton || — || align=right | 3.7 km || 
|-id=229 bgcolor=#fefefe
| 40229 ||  || — || October 14, 1998 || Socorro || LINEAR || H || align=right | 1.3 km || 
|-id=230 bgcolor=#d6d6d6
| 40230 Rožmberk ||  ||  || October 14, 1998 || Kleť || M. Tichý || THM || align=right | 7.6 km || 
|-id=231 bgcolor=#fefefe
| 40231 ||  || — || October 14, 1998 || Xinglong || SCAP || H || align=right | 1.2 km || 
|-id=232 bgcolor=#fefefe
| 40232 || 1998 UD || — || October 16, 1998 || Catalina || CSS || — || align=right | 3.4 km || 
|-id=233 bgcolor=#d6d6d6
| 40233 Baradeau ||  ||  || October 20, 1998 || Caussols || ODAS || — || align=right | 8.6 km || 
|-id=234 bgcolor=#d6d6d6
| 40234 ||  || — || October 21, 1998 || Reedy Creek || J. Broughton || — || align=right | 5.6 km || 
|-id=235 bgcolor=#d6d6d6
| 40235 ||  || — || October 23, 1998 || Višnjan Observatory || K. Korlević || — || align=right | 12 km || 
|-id=236 bgcolor=#E9E9E9
| 40236 ||  || — || October 28, 1998 || Socorro || LINEAR || — || align=right | 5.7 km || 
|-id=237 bgcolor=#C2FFFF
| 40237 ||  || — || November 11, 1998 || Nachi-Katsuura || Y. Shimizu, T. Urata || L4slow || align=right | 22 km || 
|-id=238 bgcolor=#d6d6d6
| 40238 ||  || — || November 10, 1998 || Socorro || LINEAR || 3:2 || align=right | 11 km || 
|-id=239 bgcolor=#d6d6d6
| 40239 ||  || — || November 10, 1998 || Socorro || LINEAR || — || align=right | 5.9 km || 
|-id=240 bgcolor=#d6d6d6
| 40240 ||  || — || November 10, 1998 || Socorro || LINEAR || — || align=right | 10 km || 
|-id=241 bgcolor=#fefefe
| 40241 ||  || — || November 15, 1998 || Anderson Mesa || LONEOS || H || align=right | 1.6 km || 
|-id=242 bgcolor=#d6d6d6
| 40242 ||  || — || November 14, 1998 || Kitt Peak || Spacewatch || HYG || align=right | 7.8 km || 
|-id=243 bgcolor=#fefefe
| 40243 ||  || — || November 18, 1998 || Catalina || CSS || PHO || align=right | 3.0 km || 
|-id=244 bgcolor=#fefefe
| 40244 ||  || — || November 17, 1998 || Catalina || CSS || H || align=right | 3.1 km || 
|-id=245 bgcolor=#FA8072
| 40245 ||  || — || November 23, 1998 || Socorro || LINEAR || — || align=right | 1.7 km || 
|-id=246 bgcolor=#d6d6d6
| 40246 ||  || — || November 21, 1998 || Socorro || LINEAR || 3:2 || align=right | 20 km || 
|-id=247 bgcolor=#fefefe
| 40247 ||  || — || December 11, 1998 || Socorro || LINEAR || H || align=right | 1.7 km || 
|-id=248 bgcolor=#E9E9E9
| 40248 Yukikajiura ||  ||  || December 12, 1998 || Goodricke-Pigott || R. A. Tucker || — || align=right | 6.4 km || 
|-id=249 bgcolor=#fefefe
| 40249 ||  || — || December 13, 1998 || Oizumi || T. Kobayashi || — || align=right | 2.7 km || 
|-id=250 bgcolor=#fefefe
| 40250 ||  || — || December 14, 1998 || Socorro || LINEAR || H || align=right | 1.7 km || 
|-id=251 bgcolor=#fefefe
| 40251 ||  || — || December 15, 1998 || Socorro || LINEAR || — || align=right | 2.4 km || 
|-id=252 bgcolor=#fefefe
| 40252 ||  || — || December 22, 1998 || Catalina || CSS || PHO || align=right | 2.0 km || 
|-id=253 bgcolor=#fefefe
| 40253 ||  || — || January 17, 1999 || Catalina || CSS || H || align=right | 1.9 km || 
|-id=254 bgcolor=#d6d6d6
| 40254 ||  || — || January 21, 1999 || Monte Agliale || S. Donati, M. M. M. Santangelo || — || align=right | 5.6 km || 
|-id=255 bgcolor=#fefefe
| 40255 ||  || — || February 12, 1999 || Prescott || P. G. Comba || — || align=right | 2.0 km || 
|-id=256 bgcolor=#fefefe
| 40256 ||  || — || February 10, 1999 || Socorro || LINEAR || H || align=right | 1.4 km || 
|-id=257 bgcolor=#fefefe
| 40257 ||  || — || February 10, 1999 || Socorro || LINEAR || — || align=right | 1.9 km || 
|-id=258 bgcolor=#fefefe
| 40258 ||  || — || February 12, 1999 || Socorro || LINEAR || — || align=right | 1.8 km || 
|-id=259 bgcolor=#fefefe
| 40259 ||  || — || February 10, 1999 || Socorro || LINEAR || V || align=right | 3.0 km || 
|-id=260 bgcolor=#E9E9E9
| 40260 ||  || — || February 10, 1999 || Socorro || LINEAR || — || align=right | 3.6 km || 
|-id=261 bgcolor=#fefefe
| 40261 ||  || — || February 12, 1999 || Socorro || LINEAR || V || align=right | 2.7 km || 
|-id=262 bgcolor=#C2FFFF
| 40262 ||  || — || February 7, 1999 || Kitt Peak || Spacewatch || L4 || align=right | 14 km || 
|-id=263 bgcolor=#FFC2E0
| 40263 ||  || — || March 18, 1999 || Kitt Peak || Spacewatch || AMO +1km || align=right data-sort-value="0.95" | 950 m || 
|-id=264 bgcolor=#fefefe
| 40264 ||  || — || March 20, 1999 || Socorro || LINEAR || H || align=right | 1.1 km || 
|-id=265 bgcolor=#fefefe
| 40265 ||  || — || March 19, 1999 || Socorro || LINEAR || — || align=right | 2.9 km || 
|-id=266 bgcolor=#fefefe
| 40266 || 1999 GS || — || April 5, 1999 || Višnjan Observatory || K. Korlević || NYS || align=right | 4.2 km || 
|-id=267 bgcolor=#FFC2E0
| 40267 ||  || — || April 10, 1999 || Socorro || LINEAR || APO +1km || align=right | 1.6 km || 
|-id=268 bgcolor=#fefefe
| 40268 ||  || — || April 10, 1999 || Anderson Mesa || LONEOS || FLO || align=right | 1.8 km || 
|-id=269 bgcolor=#fefefe
| 40269 ||  || — || April 6, 1999 || Socorro || LINEAR || FLO || align=right | 1.7 km || 
|-id=270 bgcolor=#fefefe
| 40270 || 1999 JE || — || May 6, 1999 || Socorro || LINEAR || H || align=right | 1.7 km || 
|-id=271 bgcolor=#FA8072
| 40271 || 1999 JT || — || May 4, 1999 || Xinglong || SCAP || PHO || align=right | 3.2 km || 
|-id=272 bgcolor=#fefefe
| 40272 ||  || — || May 8, 1999 || Catalina || CSS || CHL || align=right | 3.3 km || 
|-id=273 bgcolor=#fefefe
| 40273 ||  || — || May 13, 1999 || Reedy Creek || J. Broughton || — || align=right | 5.4 km || 
|-id=274 bgcolor=#fefefe
| 40274 ||  || — || May 10, 1999 || Socorro || LINEAR || — || align=right | 2.4 km || 
|-id=275 bgcolor=#fefefe
| 40275 ||  || — || May 10, 1999 || Socorro || LINEAR || V || align=right | 1.6 km || 
|-id=276 bgcolor=#fefefe
| 40276 ||  || — || May 10, 1999 || Socorro || LINEAR || — || align=right | 2.2 km || 
|-id=277 bgcolor=#E9E9E9
| 40277 ||  || — || May 10, 1999 || Socorro || LINEAR || — || align=right | 4.7 km || 
|-id=278 bgcolor=#fefefe
| 40278 ||  || — || May 10, 1999 || Socorro || LINEAR || FLO || align=right | 2.0 km || 
|-id=279 bgcolor=#fefefe
| 40279 ||  || — || May 10, 1999 || Socorro || LINEAR || V || align=right | 2.1 km || 
|-id=280 bgcolor=#fefefe
| 40280 ||  || — || May 10, 1999 || Socorro || LINEAR || — || align=right | 1.7 km || 
|-id=281 bgcolor=#E9E9E9
| 40281 ||  || — || May 10, 1999 || Socorro || LINEAR || — || align=right | 8.8 km || 
|-id=282 bgcolor=#E9E9E9
| 40282 ||  || — || May 10, 1999 || Socorro || LINEAR || EUN || align=right | 6.6 km || 
|-id=283 bgcolor=#E9E9E9
| 40283 ||  || — || May 10, 1999 || Socorro || LINEAR || — || align=right | 4.8 km || 
|-id=284 bgcolor=#fefefe
| 40284 ||  || — || May 10, 1999 || Socorro || LINEAR || — || align=right | 1.9 km || 
|-id=285 bgcolor=#fefefe
| 40285 ||  || — || May 10, 1999 || Socorro || LINEAR || — || align=right | 1.6 km || 
|-id=286 bgcolor=#fefefe
| 40286 ||  || — || May 10, 1999 || Socorro || LINEAR || — || align=right | 1.9 km || 
|-id=287 bgcolor=#fefefe
| 40287 ||  || — || May 10, 1999 || Socorro || LINEAR || — || align=right | 2.1 km || 
|-id=288 bgcolor=#fefefe
| 40288 ||  || — || May 10, 1999 || Socorro || LINEAR || NYS || align=right | 2.0 km || 
|-id=289 bgcolor=#E9E9E9
| 40289 ||  || — || May 10, 1999 || Socorro || LINEAR || — || align=right | 7.4 km || 
|-id=290 bgcolor=#fefefe
| 40290 ||  || — || May 10, 1999 || Socorro || LINEAR || — || align=right | 2.0 km || 
|-id=291 bgcolor=#E9E9E9
| 40291 ||  || — || May 12, 1999 || Socorro || LINEAR || — || align=right | 2.2 km || 
|-id=292 bgcolor=#fefefe
| 40292 ||  || — || May 12, 1999 || Socorro || LINEAR || — || align=right | 2.5 km || 
|-id=293 bgcolor=#fefefe
| 40293 ||  || — || May 12, 1999 || Socorro || LINEAR || FLO || align=right | 2.2 km || 
|-id=294 bgcolor=#fefefe
| 40294 ||  || — || May 12, 1999 || Socorro || LINEAR || — || align=right | 2.1 km || 
|-id=295 bgcolor=#fefefe
| 40295 ||  || — || May 12, 1999 || Socorro || LINEAR || — || align=right | 2.0 km || 
|-id=296 bgcolor=#fefefe
| 40296 ||  || — || May 12, 1999 || Socorro || LINEAR || FLO || align=right | 2.5 km || 
|-id=297 bgcolor=#fefefe
| 40297 ||  || — || May 12, 1999 || Socorro || LINEAR || — || align=right | 3.9 km || 
|-id=298 bgcolor=#fefefe
| 40298 ||  || — || May 13, 1999 || Socorro || LINEAR || — || align=right | 2.3 km || 
|-id=299 bgcolor=#E9E9E9
| 40299 ||  || — || May 12, 1999 || Socorro || LINEAR || — || align=right | 3.8 km || 
|-id=300 bgcolor=#fefefe
| 40300 ||  || — || May 12, 1999 || Socorro || LINEAR || V || align=right | 1.7 km || 
|}

40301–40400 

|-bgcolor=#fefefe
| 40301 ||  || — || May 12, 1999 || Socorro || LINEAR || — || align=right | 1.8 km || 
|-id=302 bgcolor=#E9E9E9
| 40302 ||  || — || May 12, 1999 || Socorro || LINEAR || — || align=right | 3.7 km || 
|-id=303 bgcolor=#fefefe
| 40303 ||  || — || May 12, 1999 || Socorro || LINEAR || — || align=right | 1.4 km || 
|-id=304 bgcolor=#d6d6d6
| 40304 ||  || — || May 12, 1999 || Socorro || LINEAR || — || align=right | 6.2 km || 
|-id=305 bgcolor=#fefefe
| 40305 ||  || — || May 13, 1999 || Socorro || LINEAR || FLO || align=right | 3.5 km || 
|-id=306 bgcolor=#fefefe
| 40306 ||  || — || May 13, 1999 || Socorro || LINEAR || — || align=right | 2.3 km || 
|-id=307 bgcolor=#fefefe
| 40307 ||  || — || May 13, 1999 || Socorro || LINEAR || NYS || align=right | 1.4 km || 
|-id=308 bgcolor=#fefefe
| 40308 ||  || — || May 13, 1999 || Socorro || LINEAR || V || align=right | 2.2 km || 
|-id=309 bgcolor=#fefefe
| 40309 ||  || — || May 13, 1999 || Socorro || LINEAR || — || align=right | 1.6 km || 
|-id=310 bgcolor=#FA8072
| 40310 ||  || — || May 18, 1999 || Socorro || LINEAR || — || align=right | 2.7 km || 
|-id=311 bgcolor=#fefefe
| 40311 ||  || — || May 18, 1999 || Socorro || LINEAR || — || align=right | 2.8 km || 
|-id=312 bgcolor=#fefefe
| 40312 ||  || — || May 18, 1999 || Socorro || LINEAR || — || align=right | 1.9 km || 
|-id=313 bgcolor=#fefefe
| 40313 ||  || — || May 18, 1999 || Socorro || LINEAR || — || align=right | 2.4 km || 
|-id=314 bgcolor=#C2E0FF
| 40314 ||  || — || May 16, 1999 || La Silla || A. C. Delsanti, O. R. Hainaut || SDOcritical || align=right | 321 km || 
|-id=315 bgcolor=#FA8072
| 40315 || 1999 LS || — || June 4, 1999 || Socorro || LINEAR || — || align=right | 1.3 km || 
|-id=316 bgcolor=#fefefe
| 40316 ||  || — || June 7, 1999 || Socorro || LINEAR || PHO || align=right | 8.8 km || 
|-id=317 bgcolor=#fefefe
| 40317 ||  || — || June 9, 1999 || Catalina || CSS || — || align=right | 3.4 km || 
|-id=318 bgcolor=#E9E9E9
| 40318 ||  || — || June 8, 1999 || Socorro || LINEAR || EUN || align=right | 3.4 km || 
|-id=319 bgcolor=#fefefe
| 40319 ||  || — || June 9, 1999 || Socorro || LINEAR || — || align=right | 2.1 km || 
|-id=320 bgcolor=#fefefe
| 40320 ||  || — || June 9, 1999 || Socorro || LINEAR || — || align=right | 3.2 km || 
|-id=321 bgcolor=#fefefe
| 40321 ||  || — || June 9, 1999 || Socorro || LINEAR || — || align=right | 2.4 km || 
|-id=322 bgcolor=#fefefe
| 40322 ||  || — || June 9, 1999 || Socorro || LINEAR || — || align=right | 2.8 km || 
|-id=323 bgcolor=#fefefe
| 40323 ||  || — || June 9, 1999 || Socorro || LINEAR || — || align=right | 4.6 km || 
|-id=324 bgcolor=#FA8072
| 40324 ||  || — || June 12, 1999 || Kitt Peak || Spacewatch || — || align=right | 2.9 km || 
|-id=325 bgcolor=#d6d6d6
| 40325 ||  || — || June 11, 1999 || Catalina || CSS || — || align=right | 8.9 km || 
|-id=326 bgcolor=#fefefe
| 40326 || 1999 MA || — || June 18, 1999 || Prescott || P. G. Comba || — || align=right | 4.1 km || 
|-id=327 bgcolor=#fefefe
| 40327 || 1999 MB || — || June 17, 1999 || Reedy Creek || J. Broughton || V || align=right | 2.0 km || 
|-id=328 bgcolor=#fefefe
| 40328 Dow || 1999 MK ||  || June 20, 1999 || Junk Bond || D. Healy || — || align=right | 2.4 km || 
|-id=329 bgcolor=#FFC2E0
| 40329 || 1999 ML || — || June 20, 1999 || Catalina || CSS || AMO +1km || align=right | 1.0 km || 
|-id=330 bgcolor=#fefefe
| 40330 ||  || — || June 20, 1999 || Anderson Mesa || LONEOS || NYS || align=right | 2.1 km || 
|-id=331 bgcolor=#fefefe
| 40331 ||  || — || June 17, 1999 || Farpoint || G. Hug, G. Bell || — || align=right | 2.0 km || 
|-id=332 bgcolor=#E9E9E9
| 40332 || 1999 NK || — || July 6, 1999 || Reedy Creek || J. Broughton || — || align=right | 4.6 km || 
|-id=333 bgcolor=#E9E9E9
| 40333 ||  || — || July 12, 1999 || Socorro || LINEAR || — || align=right | 12 km || 
|-id=334 bgcolor=#fefefe
| 40334 ||  || — || July 11, 1999 || Višnjan Observatory || K. Korlević || NYS || align=right | 2.4 km || 
|-id=335 bgcolor=#fefefe
| 40335 ||  || — || July 15, 1999 || Višnjan Observatory || K. Korlević || V || align=right | 3.0 km || 
|-id=336 bgcolor=#fefefe
| 40336 ||  || — || July 13, 1999 || Socorro || LINEAR || V || align=right | 2.2 km || 
|-id=337 bgcolor=#fefefe
| 40337 ||  || — || July 13, 1999 || Socorro || LINEAR || NYS || align=right | 2.1 km || 
|-id=338 bgcolor=#fefefe
| 40338 ||  || — || July 13, 1999 || Socorro || LINEAR || NYS || align=right | 2.8 km || 
|-id=339 bgcolor=#fefefe
| 40339 ||  || — || July 13, 1999 || Socorro || LINEAR || — || align=right | 2.5 km || 
|-id=340 bgcolor=#fefefe
| 40340 ||  || — || July 13, 1999 || Socorro || LINEAR || — || align=right | 4.5 km || 
|-id=341 bgcolor=#fefefe
| 40341 ||  || — || July 13, 1999 || Socorro || LINEAR || NYS || align=right | 2.2 km || 
|-id=342 bgcolor=#E9E9E9
| 40342 ||  || — || July 13, 1999 || Socorro || LINEAR || — || align=right | 2.1 km || 
|-id=343 bgcolor=#fefefe
| 40343 ||  || — || July 13, 1999 || Socorro || LINEAR || V || align=right | 2.4 km || 
|-id=344 bgcolor=#fefefe
| 40344 ||  || — || July 13, 1999 || Socorro || LINEAR || V || align=right | 2.1 km || 
|-id=345 bgcolor=#fefefe
| 40345 ||  || — || July 13, 1999 || Socorro || LINEAR || FLO || align=right | 1.5 km || 
|-id=346 bgcolor=#fefefe
| 40346 ||  || — || July 13, 1999 || Socorro || LINEAR || V || align=right | 1.6 km || 
|-id=347 bgcolor=#fefefe
| 40347 ||  || — || July 13, 1999 || Socorro || LINEAR || FLO || align=right | 2.0 km || 
|-id=348 bgcolor=#E9E9E9
| 40348 ||  || — || July 13, 1999 || Socorro || LINEAR || — || align=right | 4.2 km || 
|-id=349 bgcolor=#fefefe
| 40349 ||  || — || July 13, 1999 || Socorro || LINEAR || NYS || align=right | 2.5 km || 
|-id=350 bgcolor=#fefefe
| 40350 ||  || — || July 13, 1999 || Socorro || LINEAR || V || align=right | 1.7 km || 
|-id=351 bgcolor=#E9E9E9
| 40351 ||  || — || July 13, 1999 || Socorro || LINEAR || — || align=right | 3.3 km || 
|-id=352 bgcolor=#fefefe
| 40352 ||  || — || July 13, 1999 || Socorro || LINEAR || — || align=right | 2.7 km || 
|-id=353 bgcolor=#fefefe
| 40353 ||  || — || July 14, 1999 || Socorro || LINEAR || — || align=right | 6.2 km || 
|-id=354 bgcolor=#fefefe
| 40354 ||  || — || July 14, 1999 || Socorro || LINEAR || — || align=right | 2.0 km || 
|-id=355 bgcolor=#fefefe
| 40355 ||  || — || July 14, 1999 || Socorro || LINEAR || — || align=right | 1.8 km || 
|-id=356 bgcolor=#fefefe
| 40356 ||  || — || July 14, 1999 || Socorro || LINEAR || — || align=right | 4.3 km || 
|-id=357 bgcolor=#fefefe
| 40357 ||  || — || July 14, 1999 || Socorro || LINEAR || — || align=right | 2.4 km || 
|-id=358 bgcolor=#fefefe
| 40358 ||  || — || July 14, 1999 || Socorro || LINEAR || MAS || align=right | 2.5 km || 
|-id=359 bgcolor=#fefefe
| 40359 ||  || — || July 14, 1999 || Socorro || LINEAR || — || align=right | 2.5 km || 
|-id=360 bgcolor=#fefefe
| 40360 ||  || — || July 14, 1999 || Socorro || LINEAR || FLO || align=right | 2.4 km || 
|-id=361 bgcolor=#E9E9E9
| 40361 ||  || — || July 14, 1999 || Socorro || LINEAR || — || align=right | 3.1 km || 
|-id=362 bgcolor=#fefefe
| 40362 ||  || — || July 14, 1999 || Socorro || LINEAR || NYS || align=right | 2.2 km || 
|-id=363 bgcolor=#E9E9E9
| 40363 ||  || — || July 14, 1999 || Socorro || LINEAR || RAF || align=right | 2.4 km || 
|-id=364 bgcolor=#fefefe
| 40364 ||  || — || July 14, 1999 || Socorro || LINEAR || V || align=right | 1.9 km || 
|-id=365 bgcolor=#fefefe
| 40365 ||  || — || July 14, 1999 || Socorro || LINEAR || — || align=right | 3.3 km || 
|-id=366 bgcolor=#fefefe
| 40366 ||  || — || July 14, 1999 || Socorro || LINEAR || — || align=right | 2.0 km || 
|-id=367 bgcolor=#fefefe
| 40367 ||  || — || July 14, 1999 || Socorro || LINEAR || — || align=right | 2.6 km || 
|-id=368 bgcolor=#fefefe
| 40368 ||  || — || July 14, 1999 || Socorro || LINEAR || V || align=right | 2.5 km || 
|-id=369 bgcolor=#fefefe
| 40369 ||  || — || July 14, 1999 || Socorro || LINEAR || MAS || align=right | 2.5 km || 
|-id=370 bgcolor=#fefefe
| 40370 ||  || — || July 14, 1999 || Socorro || LINEAR || V || align=right | 1.8 km || 
|-id=371 bgcolor=#fefefe
| 40371 ||  || — || July 14, 1999 || Socorro || LINEAR || FLO || align=right | 2.1 km || 
|-id=372 bgcolor=#E9E9E9
| 40372 ||  || — || July 14, 1999 || Socorro || LINEAR || — || align=right | 3.0 km || 
|-id=373 bgcolor=#fefefe
| 40373 ||  || — || July 14, 1999 || Socorro || LINEAR || V || align=right | 2.2 km || 
|-id=374 bgcolor=#fefefe
| 40374 ||  || — || July 14, 1999 || Socorro || LINEAR || — || align=right | 2.3 km || 
|-id=375 bgcolor=#E9E9E9
| 40375 ||  || — || July 14, 1999 || Socorro || LINEAR || — || align=right | 3.4 km || 
|-id=376 bgcolor=#fefefe
| 40376 ||  || — || July 14, 1999 || Socorro || LINEAR || NYS || align=right | 1.7 km || 
|-id=377 bgcolor=#fefefe
| 40377 ||  || — || July 14, 1999 || Socorro || LINEAR || NYS || align=right | 2.4 km || 
|-id=378 bgcolor=#fefefe
| 40378 ||  || — || July 14, 1999 || Socorro || LINEAR || — || align=right | 2.8 km || 
|-id=379 bgcolor=#fefefe
| 40379 ||  || — || July 14, 1999 || Socorro || LINEAR || NYS || align=right | 2.7 km || 
|-id=380 bgcolor=#fefefe
| 40380 ||  || — || July 14, 1999 || Socorro || LINEAR || — || align=right | 3.1 km || 
|-id=381 bgcolor=#fefefe
| 40381 ||  || — || July 13, 1999 || Socorro || LINEAR || — || align=right | 2.9 km || 
|-id=382 bgcolor=#fefefe
| 40382 ||  || — || July 13, 1999 || Socorro || LINEAR || FLO || align=right | 1.9 km || 
|-id=383 bgcolor=#fefefe
| 40383 ||  || — || July 13, 1999 || Socorro || LINEAR || — || align=right | 2.2 km || 
|-id=384 bgcolor=#fefefe
| 40384 ||  || — || July 13, 1999 || Socorro || LINEAR || — || align=right | 4.8 km || 
|-id=385 bgcolor=#fefefe
| 40385 ||  || — || July 13, 1999 || Socorro || LINEAR || — || align=right | 2.6 km || 
|-id=386 bgcolor=#fefefe
| 40386 ||  || — || July 13, 1999 || Socorro || LINEAR || V || align=right | 2.1 km || 
|-id=387 bgcolor=#E9E9E9
| 40387 ||  || — || July 13, 1999 || Socorro || LINEAR || — || align=right | 12 km || 
|-id=388 bgcolor=#fefefe
| 40388 ||  || — || July 13, 1999 || Socorro || LINEAR || — || align=right | 2.7 km || 
|-id=389 bgcolor=#E9E9E9
| 40389 ||  || — || July 13, 1999 || Socorro || LINEAR || — || align=right | 5.3 km || 
|-id=390 bgcolor=#E9E9E9
| 40390 ||  || — || July 12, 1999 || Socorro || LINEAR || — || align=right | 3.6 km || 
|-id=391 bgcolor=#E9E9E9
| 40391 ||  || — || July 12, 1999 || Socorro || LINEAR || — || align=right | 4.5 km || 
|-id=392 bgcolor=#E9E9E9
| 40392 ||  || — || July 12, 1999 || Socorro || LINEAR || — || align=right | 4.9 km || 
|-id=393 bgcolor=#E9E9E9
| 40393 ||  || — || July 12, 1999 || Socorro || LINEAR || — || align=right | 2.9 km || 
|-id=394 bgcolor=#E9E9E9
| 40394 ||  || — || July 12, 1999 || Socorro || LINEAR || — || align=right | 3.2 km || 
|-id=395 bgcolor=#fefefe
| 40395 ||  || — || July 12, 1999 || Socorro || LINEAR || KLI || align=right | 4.2 km || 
|-id=396 bgcolor=#E9E9E9
| 40396 ||  || — || July 12, 1999 || Socorro || LINEAR || — || align=right | 3.4 km || 
|-id=397 bgcolor=#E9E9E9
| 40397 ||  || — || July 12, 1999 || Socorro || LINEAR || — || align=right | 4.6 km || 
|-id=398 bgcolor=#fefefe
| 40398 ||  || — || July 13, 1999 || Socorro || LINEAR || — || align=right | 7.2 km || 
|-id=399 bgcolor=#fefefe
| 40399 ||  || — || July 14, 1999 || Socorro || LINEAR || FLO || align=right | 2.9 km || 
|-id=400 bgcolor=#d6d6d6
| 40400 ||  || — || July 14, 1999 || Socorro || LINEAR || — || align=right | 5.1 km || 
|}

40401–40500 

|-bgcolor=#fefefe
| 40401 ||  || — || July 14, 1999 || Socorro || LINEAR || V || align=right | 2.1 km || 
|-id=402 bgcolor=#fefefe
| 40402 ||  || — || July 14, 1999 || Socorro || LINEAR || — || align=right | 2.4 km || 
|-id=403 bgcolor=#fefefe
| 40403 ||  || — || July 12, 1999 || Socorro || LINEAR || — || align=right | 3.4 km || 
|-id=404 bgcolor=#fefefe
| 40404 || 1999 OB || — || July 16, 1999 || Višnjan Observatory || K. Korlević || — || align=right | 3.6 km || 
|-id=405 bgcolor=#E9E9E9
| 40405 || 1999 OU || — || July 17, 1999 || Bergisch Gladbach || W. Bickel || MRX || align=right | 2.6 km || 
|-id=406 bgcolor=#fefefe
| 40406 ||  || — || July 16, 1999 || Socorro || LINEAR || V || align=right | 2.5 km || 
|-id=407 bgcolor=#fefefe
| 40407 ||  || — || August 31, 1999 || Oohira || T. Urata || SUL || align=right | 3.9 km || 
|-id=408 bgcolor=#fefefe
| 40408 ||  || — || September 4, 1999 || Catalina || CSS || V || align=right | 2.0 km || 
|-id=409 bgcolor=#fefefe
| 40409 Taichikato ||  ||  || September 6, 1999 || Ceccano || G. Masi || NYS || align=right | 1.8 km || 
|-id=410 bgcolor=#d6d6d6
| 40410 Příhoda ||  ||  || September 4, 1999 || Ondřejov || L. Kotková || — || align=right | 6.2 km || 
|-id=411 bgcolor=#fefefe
| 40411 ||  || — || September 6, 1999 || Gekko || T. Kagawa || FLO || align=right | 2.9 km || 
|-id=412 bgcolor=#E9E9E9
| 40412 ||  || — || September 4, 1999 || Kitt Peak || Spacewatch || — || align=right | 6.2 km || 
|-id=413 bgcolor=#fefefe
| 40413 ||  || — || September 7, 1999 || Socorro || LINEAR || LCI || align=right | 5.2 km || 
|-id=414 bgcolor=#fefefe
| 40414 ||  || — || September 7, 1999 || Socorro || LINEAR || MAS || align=right | 2.4 km || 
|-id=415 bgcolor=#fefefe
| 40415 ||  || — || September 7, 1999 || Socorro || LINEAR || — || align=right | 2.8 km || 
|-id=416 bgcolor=#fefefe
| 40416 ||  || — || September 7, 1999 || Socorro || LINEAR || — || align=right | 3.6 km || 
|-id=417 bgcolor=#E9E9E9
| 40417 ||  || — || September 7, 1999 || Socorro || LINEAR || — || align=right | 10 km || 
|-id=418 bgcolor=#d6d6d6
| 40418 ||  || — || September 7, 1999 || Socorro || LINEAR || — || align=right | 5.0 km || 
|-id=419 bgcolor=#E9E9E9
| 40419 ||  || — || September 7, 1999 || Socorro || LINEAR || AGN || align=right | 3.0 km || 
|-id=420 bgcolor=#E9E9E9
| 40420 ||  || — || September 7, 1999 || Socorro || LINEAR || — || align=right | 3.9 km || 
|-id=421 bgcolor=#d6d6d6
| 40421 ||  || — || September 7, 1999 || Socorro || LINEAR || — || align=right | 5.5 km || 
|-id=422 bgcolor=#fefefe
| 40422 ||  || — || September 7, 1999 || Socorro || LINEAR || NYS || align=right | 2.2 km || 
|-id=423 bgcolor=#E9E9E9
| 40423 ||  || — || September 7, 1999 || Socorro || LINEAR || — || align=right | 5.5 km || 
|-id=424 bgcolor=#fefefe
| 40424 ||  || — || September 7, 1999 || Socorro || LINEAR || — || align=right | 3.0 km || 
|-id=425 bgcolor=#E9E9E9
| 40425 ||  || — || September 7, 1999 || Socorro || LINEAR || — || align=right | 3.5 km || 
|-id=426 bgcolor=#d6d6d6
| 40426 ||  || — || September 7, 1999 || Socorro || LINEAR || HYG || align=right | 7.5 km || 
|-id=427 bgcolor=#d6d6d6
| 40427 ||  || — || September 7, 1999 || Socorro || LINEAR || 629 || align=right | 3.4 km || 
|-id=428 bgcolor=#E9E9E9
| 40428 ||  || — || September 7, 1999 || Socorro || LINEAR || — || align=right | 5.9 km || 
|-id=429 bgcolor=#E9E9E9
| 40429 ||  || — || September 7, 1999 || Višnjan Observatory || K. Korlević || EUN || align=right | 9.3 km || 
|-id=430 bgcolor=#FA8072
| 40430 ||  || — || September 7, 1999 || Socorro || LINEAR || — || align=right | 1.7 km || 
|-id=431 bgcolor=#fefefe
| 40431 ||  || — || September 8, 1999 || Socorro || LINEAR || PHO || align=right | 3.4 km || 
|-id=432 bgcolor=#E9E9E9
| 40432 ||  || — || September 8, 1999 || Socorro || LINEAR || — || align=right | 7.4 km || 
|-id=433 bgcolor=#E9E9E9
| 40433 ||  || — || September 8, 1999 || Socorro || LINEAR || PAL || align=right | 4.6 km || 
|-id=434 bgcolor=#E9E9E9
| 40434 ||  || — || September 9, 1999 || Višnjan Observatory || K. Korlević || GEF || align=right | 3.5 km || 
|-id=435 bgcolor=#d6d6d6
| 40435 ||  || — || September 9, 1999 || Višnjan Observatory || K. Korlević || — || align=right | 5.9 km || 
|-id=436 bgcolor=#E9E9E9
| 40436 Sylviecoyaud ||  ||  || September 10, 1999 || Campo Catino || Campo Catino Obs. || — || align=right | 5.8 km || 
|-id=437 bgcolor=#d6d6d6
| 40437 ||  || — || September 6, 1999 || Farpoint || G. Bell, G. Hug || — || align=right | 5.7 km || 
|-id=438 bgcolor=#d6d6d6
| 40438 ||  || — || September 6, 1999 || Farpoint || G. Bell, G. Hug || KOR || align=right | 3.9 km || 
|-id=439 bgcolor=#d6d6d6
| 40439 ||  || — || September 9, 1999 || Višnjan Observatory || K. Korlević || THM || align=right | 8.7 km || 
|-id=440 bgcolor=#d6d6d6
| 40440 Dobrovský ||  ||  || September 11, 1999 || Ondřejov || P. Pravec, P. Kušnirák || EOS || align=right | 4.8 km || 
|-id=441 bgcolor=#E9E9E9
| 40441 Jungmann ||  ||  || September 11, 1999 || Ondřejov || P. Pravec, P. Kušnirák || — || align=right | 3.1 km || 
|-id=442 bgcolor=#E9E9E9
| 40442 ||  || — || September 11, 1999 || Višnjan Observatory || K. Korlević || — || align=right | 5.9 km || 
|-id=443 bgcolor=#E9E9E9
| 40443 ||  || — || September 7, 1999 || Uccle || E. W. Elst || — || align=right | 2.3 km || 
|-id=444 bgcolor=#d6d6d6
| 40444 Palacký ||  ||  || September 12, 1999 || Ondřejov || P. Pravec, M. Wolf || KOR || align=right | 2.9 km || 
|-id=445 bgcolor=#fefefe
| 40445 ||  || — || September 12, 1999 || Prescott || P. G. Comba || V || align=right | 1.5 km || 
|-id=446 bgcolor=#E9E9E9
| 40446 ||  || — || September 12, 1999 || Črni Vrh || Črni Vrh || EUN || align=right | 5.8 km || 
|-id=447 bgcolor=#E9E9E9
| 40447 Lorenzoni ||  ||  || September 11, 1999 || Bologna || San Vittore Obs. || — || align=right | 2.4 km || 
|-id=448 bgcolor=#fefefe
| 40448 ||  || — || September 12, 1999 || Višnjan Observatory || K. Korlević || V || align=right | 2.3 km || 
|-id=449 bgcolor=#fefefe
| 40449 ||  || — || September 12, 1999 || Višnjan Observatory || K. Korlević || — || align=right | 2.2 km || 
|-id=450 bgcolor=#d6d6d6
| 40450 ||  || — || September 12, 1999 || Višnjan Observatory || K. Korlević || EOS || align=right | 5.2 km || 
|-id=451 bgcolor=#E9E9E9
| 40451 ||  || — || September 13, 1999 || Višnjan Observatory || K. Korlević || MAR || align=right | 3.2 km || 
|-id=452 bgcolor=#fefefe
| 40452 ||  || — || September 12, 1999 || Reedy Creek || J. Broughton || V || align=right | 1.6 km || 
|-id=453 bgcolor=#fefefe
| 40453 ||  || — || September 13, 1999 || Reedy Creek || J. Broughton || V || align=right | 2.5 km || 
|-id=454 bgcolor=#E9E9E9
| 40454 ||  || — || September 12, 1999 || Catalina || CSS || GEF || align=right | 3.2 km || 
|-id=455 bgcolor=#d6d6d6
| 40455 ||  || — || September 12, 1999 || Catalina || CSS || URS || align=right | 6.6 km || 
|-id=456 bgcolor=#d6d6d6
| 40456 ||  || — || September 13, 1999 || Višnjan Observatory || K. Korlević || THM || align=right | 7.4 km || 
|-id=457 bgcolor=#fefefe
| 40457 Williamkuhn ||  ||  || September 4, 1999 || OCA-Anza || M. Collins, M. White || — || align=right | 2.1 km || 
|-id=458 bgcolor=#fefefe
| 40458 ||  || — || September 14, 1999 || Višnjan Observatory || K. Korlević || V || align=right | 1.8 km || 
|-id=459 bgcolor=#E9E9E9
| 40459 Rektorys ||  ||  || September 14, 1999 || Ondřejov || P. Pravec, P. Kušnirák || GEF || align=right | 3.6 km || 
|-id=460 bgcolor=#E9E9E9
| 40460 ||  || — || September 15, 1999 || Višnjan Observatory || K. Korlević || — || align=right | 3.1 km || 
|-id=461 bgcolor=#d6d6d6
| 40461 ||  || — || September 15, 1999 || Višnjan Observatory || K. Korlević || EOS || align=right | 6.2 km || 
|-id=462 bgcolor=#E9E9E9
| 40462 ||  || — || September 15, 1999 || Višnjan Observatory || Višnjan Obs. || — || align=right | 5.1 km || 
|-id=463 bgcolor=#E9E9E9
| 40463 Frankkameny ||  ||  || September 15, 1999 || Calgary || G. W. Billings || — || align=right | 3.9 km || 
|-id=464 bgcolor=#E9E9E9
| 40464 ||  || — || September 8, 1999 || Socorro || LINEAR || GER || align=right | 4.8 km || 
|-id=465 bgcolor=#E9E9E9
| 40465 ||  || — || September 14, 1999 || Višnjan Observatory || K. Korlević || — || align=right | 3.4 km || 
|-id=466 bgcolor=#E9E9E9
| 40466 ||  || — || September 14, 1999 || Črni Vrh || Črni Vrh || EUN || align=right | 3.0 km || 
|-id=467 bgcolor=#fefefe
| 40467 ||  || — || September 7, 1999 || Socorro || LINEAR || V || align=right | 2.3 km || 
|-id=468 bgcolor=#FA8072
| 40468 ||  || — || September 7, 1999 || Socorro || LINEAR || PHO || align=right | 2.9 km || 
|-id=469 bgcolor=#fefefe
| 40469 ||  || — || September 7, 1999 || Socorro || LINEAR || — || align=right | 2.9 km || 
|-id=470 bgcolor=#fefefe
| 40470 ||  || — || September 7, 1999 || Socorro || LINEAR || — || align=right | 3.3 km || 
|-id=471 bgcolor=#E9E9E9
| 40471 ||  || — || September 7, 1999 || Socorro || LINEAR || — || align=right | 7.6 km || 
|-id=472 bgcolor=#fefefe
| 40472 ||  || — || September 7, 1999 || Socorro || LINEAR || NYS || align=right | 2.1 km || 
|-id=473 bgcolor=#fefefe
| 40473 ||  || — || September 7, 1999 || Socorro || LINEAR || NYS || align=right | 4.6 km || 
|-id=474 bgcolor=#fefefe
| 40474 ||  || — || September 7, 1999 || Socorro || LINEAR || — || align=right | 2.5 km || 
|-id=475 bgcolor=#E9E9E9
| 40475 ||  || — || September 7, 1999 || Socorro || LINEAR || — || align=right | 2.3 km || 
|-id=476 bgcolor=#fefefe
| 40476 ||  || — || September 7, 1999 || Socorro || LINEAR || V || align=right | 2.5 km || 
|-id=477 bgcolor=#E9E9E9
| 40477 ||  || — || September 7, 1999 || Socorro || LINEAR || — || align=right | 4.0 km || 
|-id=478 bgcolor=#fefefe
| 40478 ||  || — || September 7, 1999 || Socorro || LINEAR || MAS || align=right | 1.7 km || 
|-id=479 bgcolor=#E9E9E9
| 40479 ||  || — || September 7, 1999 || Socorro || LINEAR || — || align=right | 3.1 km || 
|-id=480 bgcolor=#E9E9E9
| 40480 ||  || — || September 7, 1999 || Socorro || LINEAR || RAF || align=right | 3.4 km || 
|-id=481 bgcolor=#fefefe
| 40481 ||  || — || September 7, 1999 || Socorro || LINEAR || NYS || align=right | 4.9 km || 
|-id=482 bgcolor=#E9E9E9
| 40482 ||  || — || September 7, 1999 || Socorro || LINEAR || — || align=right | 3.4 km || 
|-id=483 bgcolor=#E9E9E9
| 40483 ||  || — || September 7, 1999 || Socorro || LINEAR || GEF || align=right | 3.4 km || 
|-id=484 bgcolor=#fefefe
| 40484 ||  || — || September 7, 1999 || Socorro || LINEAR || — || align=right | 3.4 km || 
|-id=485 bgcolor=#fefefe
| 40485 ||  || — || September 7, 1999 || Socorro || LINEAR || NYS || align=right | 3.4 km || 
|-id=486 bgcolor=#fefefe
| 40486 ||  || — || September 7, 1999 || Socorro || LINEAR || V || align=right | 1.7 km || 
|-id=487 bgcolor=#d6d6d6
| 40487 ||  || — || September 7, 1999 || Socorro || LINEAR || — || align=right | 6.1 km || 
|-id=488 bgcolor=#d6d6d6
| 40488 ||  || — || September 7, 1999 || Socorro || LINEAR || — || align=right | 5.9 km || 
|-id=489 bgcolor=#fefefe
| 40489 ||  || — || September 7, 1999 || Socorro || LINEAR || NYS || align=right | 1.9 km || 
|-id=490 bgcolor=#E9E9E9
| 40490 ||  || — || September 7, 1999 || Socorro || LINEAR || GEF || align=right | 3.5 km || 
|-id=491 bgcolor=#d6d6d6
| 40491 ||  || — || September 7, 1999 || Socorro || LINEAR || KOR || align=right | 3.2 km || 
|-id=492 bgcolor=#fefefe
| 40492 ||  || — || September 7, 1999 || Socorro || LINEAR || — || align=right | 1.8 km || 
|-id=493 bgcolor=#E9E9E9
| 40493 ||  || — || September 7, 1999 || Socorro || LINEAR || — || align=right | 2.4 km || 
|-id=494 bgcolor=#E9E9E9
| 40494 ||  || — || September 7, 1999 || Socorro || LINEAR || — || align=right | 2.7 km || 
|-id=495 bgcolor=#d6d6d6
| 40495 ||  || — || September 7, 1999 || Socorro || LINEAR || NAE || align=right | 5.3 km || 
|-id=496 bgcolor=#E9E9E9
| 40496 ||  || — || September 7, 1999 || Socorro || LINEAR || — || align=right | 5.3 km || 
|-id=497 bgcolor=#d6d6d6
| 40497 ||  || — || September 7, 1999 || Socorro || LINEAR || EOS || align=right | 4.2 km || 
|-id=498 bgcolor=#E9E9E9
| 40498 ||  || — || September 7, 1999 || Socorro || LINEAR || — || align=right | 5.8 km || 
|-id=499 bgcolor=#E9E9E9
| 40499 ||  || — || September 7, 1999 || Socorro || LINEAR || — || align=right | 2.6 km || 
|-id=500 bgcolor=#d6d6d6
| 40500 ||  || — || September 7, 1999 || Socorro || LINEAR || — || align=right | 7.7 km || 
|}

40501–40600 

|-bgcolor=#E9E9E9
| 40501 ||  || — || September 7, 1999 || Socorro || LINEAR || slow || align=right | 6.2 km || 
|-id=502 bgcolor=#E9E9E9
| 40502 ||  || — || September 7, 1999 || Socorro || LINEAR || — || align=right | 3.0 km || 
|-id=503 bgcolor=#fefefe
| 40503 ||  || — || September 7, 1999 || Socorro || LINEAR || NYS || align=right | 2.7 km || 
|-id=504 bgcolor=#E9E9E9
| 40504 ||  || — || September 7, 1999 || Socorro || LINEAR || — || align=right | 2.7 km || 
|-id=505 bgcolor=#E9E9E9
| 40505 ||  || — || September 7, 1999 || Socorro || LINEAR || — || align=right | 3.6 km || 
|-id=506 bgcolor=#E9E9E9
| 40506 ||  || — || September 7, 1999 || Socorro || LINEAR || — || align=right | 2.5 km || 
|-id=507 bgcolor=#E9E9E9
| 40507 ||  || — || September 7, 1999 || Socorro || LINEAR || — || align=right | 5.9 km || 
|-id=508 bgcolor=#fefefe
| 40508 ||  || — || September 7, 1999 || Socorro || LINEAR || — || align=right | 2.3 km || 
|-id=509 bgcolor=#d6d6d6
| 40509 ||  || — || September 7, 1999 || Socorro || LINEAR || — || align=right | 4.9 km || 
|-id=510 bgcolor=#d6d6d6
| 40510 ||  || — || September 7, 1999 || Socorro || LINEAR || K-2 || align=right | 4.1 km || 
|-id=511 bgcolor=#fefefe
| 40511 ||  || — || September 7, 1999 || Socorro || LINEAR || NYSfast || align=right | 1.9 km || 
|-id=512 bgcolor=#E9E9E9
| 40512 ||  || — || September 7, 1999 || Socorro || LINEAR || HEN || align=right | 2.8 km || 
|-id=513 bgcolor=#E9E9E9
| 40513 ||  || — || September 7, 1999 || Socorro || LINEAR || — || align=right | 4.8 km || 
|-id=514 bgcolor=#E9E9E9
| 40514 ||  || — || September 7, 1999 || Socorro || LINEAR || — || align=right | 3.0 km || 
|-id=515 bgcolor=#E9E9E9
| 40515 ||  || — || September 7, 1999 || Socorro || LINEAR || — || align=right | 5.6 km || 
|-id=516 bgcolor=#d6d6d6
| 40516 ||  || — || September 7, 1999 || Socorro || LINEAR || KOR || align=right | 5.3 km || 
|-id=517 bgcolor=#E9E9E9
| 40517 ||  || — || September 7, 1999 || Socorro || LINEAR || — || align=right | 3.1 km || 
|-id=518 bgcolor=#E9E9E9
| 40518 ||  || — || September 7, 1999 || Socorro || LINEAR || — || align=right | 2.5 km || 
|-id=519 bgcolor=#E9E9E9
| 40519 ||  || — || September 7, 1999 || Socorro || LINEAR || WIT || align=right | 2.5 km || 
|-id=520 bgcolor=#E9E9E9
| 40520 ||  || — || September 7, 1999 || Socorro || LINEAR || GEF || align=right | 4.2 km || 
|-id=521 bgcolor=#E9E9E9
| 40521 ||  || — || September 7, 1999 || Socorro || LINEAR || — || align=right | 2.6 km || 
|-id=522 bgcolor=#E9E9E9
| 40522 ||  || — || September 7, 1999 || Socorro || LINEAR || — || align=right | 5.4 km || 
|-id=523 bgcolor=#E9E9E9
| 40523 ||  || — || September 7, 1999 || Socorro || LINEAR || — || align=right | 2.9 km || 
|-id=524 bgcolor=#E9E9E9
| 40524 ||  || — || September 7, 1999 || Socorro || LINEAR || — || align=right | 3.2 km || 
|-id=525 bgcolor=#fefefe
| 40525 ||  || — || September 7, 1999 || Socorro || LINEAR || MAS || align=right | 1.6 km || 
|-id=526 bgcolor=#E9E9E9
| 40526 ||  || — || September 7, 1999 || Socorro || LINEAR || HEN || align=right | 3.3 km || 
|-id=527 bgcolor=#E9E9E9
| 40527 ||  || — || September 7, 1999 || Socorro || LINEAR || — || align=right | 2.5 km || 
|-id=528 bgcolor=#d6d6d6
| 40528 ||  || — || September 7, 1999 || Socorro || LINEAR || MEL || align=right | 11 km || 
|-id=529 bgcolor=#fefefe
| 40529 ||  || — || September 7, 1999 || Socorro || LINEAR || — || align=right | 2.8 km || 
|-id=530 bgcolor=#fefefe
| 40530 ||  || — || September 8, 1999 || Socorro || LINEAR || V || align=right | 1.7 km || 
|-id=531 bgcolor=#E9E9E9
| 40531 ||  || — || September 8, 1999 || Socorro || LINEAR || GEF || align=right | 3.2 km || 
|-id=532 bgcolor=#E9E9E9
| 40532 ||  || — || September 8, 1999 || Socorro || LINEAR || GEF || align=right | 5.8 km || 
|-id=533 bgcolor=#fefefe
| 40533 ||  || — || September 8, 1999 || Socorro || LINEAR || LCI || align=right | 2.7 km || 
|-id=534 bgcolor=#fefefe
| 40534 ||  || — || September 8, 1999 || Socorro || LINEAR || — || align=right | 4.0 km || 
|-id=535 bgcolor=#E9E9E9
| 40535 ||  || — || September 8, 1999 || Socorro || LINEAR || EUN || align=right | 3.4 km || 
|-id=536 bgcolor=#fefefe
| 40536 ||  || — || September 8, 1999 || Socorro || LINEAR || V || align=right | 2.0 km || 
|-id=537 bgcolor=#E9E9E9
| 40537 ||  || — || September 8, 1999 || Socorro || LINEAR || — || align=right | 3.2 km || 
|-id=538 bgcolor=#fefefe
| 40538 ||  || — || September 8, 1999 || Socorro || LINEAR || V || align=right | 3.3 km || 
|-id=539 bgcolor=#E9E9E9
| 40539 ||  || — || September 8, 1999 || Socorro || LINEAR || ADE || align=right | 6.2 km || 
|-id=540 bgcolor=#fefefe
| 40540 ||  || — || September 8, 1999 || Socorro || LINEAR || — || align=right | 3.0 km || 
|-id=541 bgcolor=#E9E9E9
| 40541 ||  || — || September 8, 1999 || Socorro || LINEAR || GEF || align=right | 3.5 km || 
|-id=542 bgcolor=#E9E9E9
| 40542 ||  || — || September 8, 1999 || Socorro || LINEAR || — || align=right | 3.5 km || 
|-id=543 bgcolor=#E9E9E9
| 40543 ||  || — || September 8, 1999 || Socorro || LINEAR || WIT || align=right | 2.7 km || 
|-id=544 bgcolor=#E9E9E9
| 40544 ||  || — || September 8, 1999 || Socorro || LINEAR || — || align=right | 3.8 km || 
|-id=545 bgcolor=#E9E9E9
| 40545 ||  || — || September 8, 1999 || Socorro || LINEAR || EUN || align=right | 3.5 km || 
|-id=546 bgcolor=#d6d6d6
| 40546 ||  || — || September 8, 1999 || Socorro || LINEAR || EOS || align=right | 8.6 km || 
|-id=547 bgcolor=#E9E9E9
| 40547 ||  || — || September 9, 1999 || Socorro || LINEAR || EUN || align=right | 3.4 km || 
|-id=548 bgcolor=#fefefe
| 40548 ||  || — || September 9, 1999 || Socorro || LINEAR || — || align=right | 2.9 km || 
|-id=549 bgcolor=#fefefe
| 40549 ||  || — || September 9, 1999 || Socorro || LINEAR || V || align=right | 2.2 km || 
|-id=550 bgcolor=#fefefe
| 40550 ||  || — || September 9, 1999 || Socorro || LINEAR || FLO || align=right | 2.3 km || 
|-id=551 bgcolor=#d6d6d6
| 40551 ||  || — || September 9, 1999 || Socorro || LINEAR || — || align=right | 6.5 km || 
|-id=552 bgcolor=#E9E9E9
| 40552 ||  || — || September 9, 1999 || Socorro || LINEAR || — || align=right | 7.9 km || 
|-id=553 bgcolor=#fefefe
| 40553 ||  || — || September 9, 1999 || Socorro || LINEAR || NYS || align=right | 5.4 km || 
|-id=554 bgcolor=#E9E9E9
| 40554 ||  || — || September 9, 1999 || Socorro || LINEAR || — || align=right | 3.6 km || 
|-id=555 bgcolor=#E9E9E9
| 40555 ||  || — || September 9, 1999 || Socorro || LINEAR || — || align=right | 3.7 km || 
|-id=556 bgcolor=#fefefe
| 40556 ||  || — || September 9, 1999 || Socorro || LINEAR || — || align=right | 3.2 km || 
|-id=557 bgcolor=#E9E9E9
| 40557 ||  || — || September 9, 1999 || Socorro || LINEAR || EUN || align=right | 3.2 km || 
|-id=558 bgcolor=#fefefe
| 40558 ||  || — || September 9, 1999 || Socorro || LINEAR || FLO || align=right | 2.1 km || 
|-id=559 bgcolor=#fefefe
| 40559 ||  || — || September 9, 1999 || Socorro || LINEAR || V || align=right | 2.6 km || 
|-id=560 bgcolor=#E9E9E9
| 40560 ||  || — || September 9, 1999 || Socorro || LINEAR || — || align=right | 7.5 km || 
|-id=561 bgcolor=#fefefe
| 40561 ||  || — || September 9, 1999 || Socorro || LINEAR || V || align=right | 1.5 km || 
|-id=562 bgcolor=#fefefe
| 40562 ||  || — || September 9, 1999 || Socorro || LINEAR || V || align=right | 2.0 km || 
|-id=563 bgcolor=#E9E9E9
| 40563 ||  || — || September 9, 1999 || Socorro || LINEAR || WIT || align=right | 2.7 km || 
|-id=564 bgcolor=#E9E9E9
| 40564 ||  || — || September 9, 1999 || Socorro || LINEAR || — || align=right | 5.9 km || 
|-id=565 bgcolor=#fefefe
| 40565 ||  || — || September 9, 1999 || Socorro || LINEAR || NYS || align=right | 2.0 km || 
|-id=566 bgcolor=#E9E9E9
| 40566 ||  || — || September 9, 1999 || Socorro || LINEAR || — || align=right | 3.2 km || 
|-id=567 bgcolor=#E9E9E9
| 40567 ||  || — || September 9, 1999 || Socorro || LINEAR || — || align=right | 4.1 km || 
|-id=568 bgcolor=#E9E9E9
| 40568 ||  || — || September 9, 1999 || Socorro || LINEAR || — || align=right | 4.4 km || 
|-id=569 bgcolor=#fefefe
| 40569 ||  || — || September 9, 1999 || Socorro || LINEAR || — || align=right | 4.9 km || 
|-id=570 bgcolor=#E9E9E9
| 40570 ||  || — || September 9, 1999 || Socorro || LINEAR || — || align=right | 2.7 km || 
|-id=571 bgcolor=#fefefe
| 40571 ||  || — || September 9, 1999 || Socorro || LINEAR || NYS || align=right | 4.5 km || 
|-id=572 bgcolor=#fefefe
| 40572 ||  || — || September 9, 1999 || Socorro || LINEAR || V || align=right | 1.9 km || 
|-id=573 bgcolor=#d6d6d6
| 40573 ||  || — || September 9, 1999 || Socorro || LINEAR || — || align=right | 4.9 km || 
|-id=574 bgcolor=#fefefe
| 40574 ||  || — || September 9, 1999 || Socorro || LINEAR || V || align=right | 1.7 km || 
|-id=575 bgcolor=#E9E9E9
| 40575 ||  || — || September 9, 1999 || Socorro || LINEAR || — || align=right | 3.3 km || 
|-id=576 bgcolor=#d6d6d6
| 40576 ||  || — || September 9, 1999 || Socorro || LINEAR || EOS || align=right | 5.8 km || 
|-id=577 bgcolor=#E9E9E9
| 40577 ||  || — || September 9, 1999 || Socorro || LINEAR || — || align=right | 3.0 km || 
|-id=578 bgcolor=#d6d6d6
| 40578 ||  || — || September 9, 1999 || Socorro || LINEAR || — || align=right | 6.9 km || 
|-id=579 bgcolor=#fefefe
| 40579 ||  || — || September 9, 1999 || Socorro || LINEAR || NYS || align=right | 1.5 km || 
|-id=580 bgcolor=#E9E9E9
| 40580 ||  || — || September 9, 1999 || Socorro || LINEAR || — || align=right | 2.6 km || 
|-id=581 bgcolor=#fefefe
| 40581 ||  || — || September 9, 1999 || Socorro || LINEAR || — || align=right | 1.6 km || 
|-id=582 bgcolor=#fefefe
| 40582 ||  || — || September 9, 1999 || Socorro || LINEAR || NYS || align=right | 1.7 km || 
|-id=583 bgcolor=#E9E9E9
| 40583 ||  || — || September 9, 1999 || Socorro || LINEAR || — || align=right | 2.9 km || 
|-id=584 bgcolor=#E9E9E9
| 40584 ||  || — || September 9, 1999 || Socorro || LINEAR || ADE || align=right | 6.1 km || 
|-id=585 bgcolor=#E9E9E9
| 40585 ||  || — || September 9, 1999 || Socorro || LINEAR || — || align=right | 3.2 km || 
|-id=586 bgcolor=#d6d6d6
| 40586 ||  || — || September 9, 1999 || Socorro || LINEAR || THM || align=right | 6.6 km || 
|-id=587 bgcolor=#fefefe
| 40587 ||  || — || September 9, 1999 || Socorro || LINEAR || V || align=right | 2.1 km || 
|-id=588 bgcolor=#E9E9E9
| 40588 ||  || — || September 9, 1999 || Socorro || LINEAR || — || align=right | 4.1 km || 
|-id=589 bgcolor=#E9E9E9
| 40589 ||  || — || September 9, 1999 || Socorro || LINEAR || — || align=right | 2.5 km || 
|-id=590 bgcolor=#fefefe
| 40590 ||  || — || September 9, 1999 || Socorro || LINEAR || — || align=right | 2.1 km || 
|-id=591 bgcolor=#fefefe
| 40591 ||  || — || September 9, 1999 || Socorro || LINEAR || — || align=right | 3.4 km || 
|-id=592 bgcolor=#E9E9E9
| 40592 ||  || — || September 9, 1999 || Socorro || LINEAR || — || align=right | 4.0 km || 
|-id=593 bgcolor=#fefefe
| 40593 ||  || — || September 9, 1999 || Socorro || LINEAR || — || align=right | 2.9 km || 
|-id=594 bgcolor=#fefefe
| 40594 ||  || — || September 9, 1999 || Socorro || LINEAR || V || align=right | 2.0 km || 
|-id=595 bgcolor=#E9E9E9
| 40595 ||  || — || September 9, 1999 || Socorro || LINEAR || — || align=right | 2.5 km || 
|-id=596 bgcolor=#d6d6d6
| 40596 ||  || — || September 9, 1999 || Socorro || LINEAR || — || align=right | 6.6 km || 
|-id=597 bgcolor=#E9E9E9
| 40597 ||  || — || September 9, 1999 || Socorro || LINEAR || HEN || align=right | 3.1 km || 
|-id=598 bgcolor=#fefefe
| 40598 ||  || — || September 9, 1999 || Socorro || LINEAR || — || align=right | 1.6 km || 
|-id=599 bgcolor=#E9E9E9
| 40599 ||  || — || September 9, 1999 || Socorro || LINEAR || — || align=right | 2.7 km || 
|-id=600 bgcolor=#fefefe
| 40600 ||  || — || September 9, 1999 || Socorro || LINEAR || — || align=right | 2.3 km || 
|}

40601–40700 

|-bgcolor=#d6d6d6
| 40601 ||  || — || September 9, 1999 || Socorro || LINEAR || KOR || align=right | 3.7 km || 
|-id=602 bgcolor=#fefefe
| 40602 ||  || — || September 9, 1999 || Socorro || LINEAR || — || align=right | 2.3 km || 
|-id=603 bgcolor=#E9E9E9
| 40603 ||  || — || September 9, 1999 || Socorro || LINEAR || GEF || align=right | 4.0 km || 
|-id=604 bgcolor=#E9E9E9
| 40604 ||  || — || September 9, 1999 || Socorro || LINEAR || — || align=right | 5.9 km || 
|-id=605 bgcolor=#E9E9E9
| 40605 ||  || — || September 9, 1999 || Socorro || LINEAR || — || align=right | 3.1 km || 
|-id=606 bgcolor=#E9E9E9
| 40606 ||  || — || September 9, 1999 || Socorro || LINEAR || DOR || align=right | 6.2 km || 
|-id=607 bgcolor=#d6d6d6
| 40607 ||  || — || September 9, 1999 || Socorro || LINEAR || — || align=right | 6.1 km || 
|-id=608 bgcolor=#fefefe
| 40608 ||  || — || September 9, 1999 || Socorro || LINEAR || V || align=right | 1.7 km || 
|-id=609 bgcolor=#fefefe
| 40609 ||  || — || September 9, 1999 || Socorro || LINEAR || — || align=right | 3.0 km || 
|-id=610 bgcolor=#E9E9E9
| 40610 ||  || — || September 9, 1999 || Socorro || LINEAR || VIB || align=right | 6.2 km || 
|-id=611 bgcolor=#fefefe
| 40611 ||  || — || September 9, 1999 || Socorro || LINEAR || NYS || align=right | 2.8 km || 
|-id=612 bgcolor=#d6d6d6
| 40612 ||  || — || September 9, 1999 || Socorro || LINEAR || EOS || align=right | 4.6 km || 
|-id=613 bgcolor=#E9E9E9
| 40613 ||  || — || September 9, 1999 || Socorro || LINEAR || — || align=right | 3.2 km || 
|-id=614 bgcolor=#E9E9E9
| 40614 ||  || — || September 9, 1999 || Socorro || LINEAR || WIT || align=right | 3.6 km || 
|-id=615 bgcolor=#E9E9E9
| 40615 ||  || — || September 9, 1999 || Socorro || LINEAR || — || align=right | 6.9 km || 
|-id=616 bgcolor=#d6d6d6
| 40616 ||  || — || September 9, 1999 || Socorro || LINEAR || KOR || align=right | 3.7 km || 
|-id=617 bgcolor=#d6d6d6
| 40617 ||  || — || September 9, 1999 || Socorro || LINEAR || — || align=right | 4.6 km || 
|-id=618 bgcolor=#E9E9E9
| 40618 ||  || — || September 9, 1999 || Socorro || LINEAR || — || align=right | 3.3 km || 
|-id=619 bgcolor=#E9E9E9
| 40619 ||  || — || September 9, 1999 || Socorro || LINEAR || HEN || align=right | 2.5 km || 
|-id=620 bgcolor=#d6d6d6
| 40620 ||  || — || September 9, 1999 || Socorro || LINEAR || — || align=right | 5.2 km || 
|-id=621 bgcolor=#E9E9E9
| 40621 ||  || — || September 9, 1999 || Socorro || LINEAR || GEF || align=right | 3.0 km || 
|-id=622 bgcolor=#fefefe
| 40622 ||  || — || September 9, 1999 || Socorro || LINEAR || NYS || align=right | 1.5 km || 
|-id=623 bgcolor=#E9E9E9
| 40623 ||  || — || September 9, 1999 || Socorro || LINEAR || — || align=right | 7.5 km || 
|-id=624 bgcolor=#fefefe
| 40624 ||  || — || September 9, 1999 || Socorro || LINEAR || — || align=right | 1.9 km || 
|-id=625 bgcolor=#E9E9E9
| 40625 ||  || — || September 9, 1999 || Socorro || LINEAR || — || align=right | 6.3 km || 
|-id=626 bgcolor=#E9E9E9
| 40626 ||  || — || September 9, 1999 || Socorro || LINEAR || — || align=right | 2.4 km || 
|-id=627 bgcolor=#E9E9E9
| 40627 ||  || — || September 9, 1999 || Socorro || LINEAR || — || align=right | 4.0 km || 
|-id=628 bgcolor=#E9E9E9
| 40628 ||  || — || September 9, 1999 || Socorro || LINEAR || KRM || align=right | 6.0 km || 
|-id=629 bgcolor=#fefefe
| 40629 ||  || — || September 9, 1999 || Socorro || LINEAR || — || align=right | 3.1 km || 
|-id=630 bgcolor=#E9E9E9
| 40630 ||  || — || September 9, 1999 || Socorro || LINEAR || — || align=right | 3.9 km || 
|-id=631 bgcolor=#E9E9E9
| 40631 ||  || — || September 9, 1999 || Socorro || LINEAR || — || align=right | 2.4 km || 
|-id=632 bgcolor=#fefefe
| 40632 ||  || — || September 9, 1999 || Socorro || LINEAR || — || align=right | 1.7 km || 
|-id=633 bgcolor=#E9E9E9
| 40633 ||  || — || September 9, 1999 || Socorro || LINEAR || — || align=right | 2.2 km || 
|-id=634 bgcolor=#fefefe
| 40634 ||  || — || September 9, 1999 || Socorro || LINEAR || FLO || align=right | 1.5 km || 
|-id=635 bgcolor=#fefefe
| 40635 ||  || — || September 9, 1999 || Socorro || LINEAR || — || align=right | 4.6 km || 
|-id=636 bgcolor=#fefefe
| 40636 ||  || — || September 9, 1999 || Socorro || LINEAR || — || align=right | 2.6 km || 
|-id=637 bgcolor=#E9E9E9
| 40637 ||  || — || September 9, 1999 || Socorro || LINEAR || MAR || align=right | 2.8 km || 
|-id=638 bgcolor=#E9E9E9
| 40638 ||  || — || September 9, 1999 || Socorro || LINEAR || — || align=right | 2.1 km || 
|-id=639 bgcolor=#fefefe
| 40639 ||  || — || September 9, 1999 || Socorro || LINEAR || NYS || align=right | 3.9 km || 
|-id=640 bgcolor=#d6d6d6
| 40640 ||  || — || September 9, 1999 || Socorro || LINEAR || THM || align=right | 6.9 km || 
|-id=641 bgcolor=#E9E9E9
| 40641 ||  || — || September 9, 1999 || Socorro || LINEAR || — || align=right | 2.1 km || 
|-id=642 bgcolor=#E9E9E9
| 40642 ||  || — || September 9, 1999 || Socorro || LINEAR || — || align=right | 3.2 km || 
|-id=643 bgcolor=#fefefe
| 40643 ||  || — || September 9, 1999 || Socorro || LINEAR || NYS || align=right | 4.6 km || 
|-id=644 bgcolor=#d6d6d6
| 40644 ||  || — || September 9, 1999 || Socorro || LINEAR || — || align=right | 5.0 km || 
|-id=645 bgcolor=#E9E9E9
| 40645 ||  || — || September 9, 1999 || Socorro || LINEAR || — || align=right | 4.1 km || 
|-id=646 bgcolor=#fefefe
| 40646 ||  || — || September 9, 1999 || Socorro || LINEAR || — || align=right | 2.1 km || 
|-id=647 bgcolor=#fefefe
| 40647 ||  || — || September 9, 1999 || Socorro || LINEAR || — || align=right | 2.2 km || 
|-id=648 bgcolor=#E9E9E9
| 40648 ||  || — || September 9, 1999 || Socorro || LINEAR || — || align=right | 2.7 km || 
|-id=649 bgcolor=#E9E9E9
| 40649 ||  || — || September 9, 1999 || Socorro || LINEAR || — || align=right | 3.3 km || 
|-id=650 bgcolor=#E9E9E9
| 40650 ||  || — || September 9, 1999 || Socorro || LINEAR || — || align=right | 3.6 km || 
|-id=651 bgcolor=#E9E9E9
| 40651 ||  || — || September 9, 1999 || Socorro || LINEAR || — || align=right | 4.5 km || 
|-id=652 bgcolor=#E9E9E9
| 40652 ||  || — || September 9, 1999 || Socorro || LINEAR || — || align=right | 3.2 km || 
|-id=653 bgcolor=#fefefe
| 40653 ||  || — || September 10, 1999 || Socorro || LINEAR || NYS || align=right | 1.4 km || 
|-id=654 bgcolor=#E9E9E9
| 40654 ||  || — || September 11, 1999 || Socorro || LINEAR || — || align=right | 2.6 km || 
|-id=655 bgcolor=#E9E9E9
| 40655 ||  || — || September 15, 1999 || Kitt Peak || Spacewatch || — || align=right | 3.7 km || 
|-id=656 bgcolor=#E9E9E9
| 40656 ||  || — || September 11, 1999 || Socorro || LINEAR || — || align=right | 5.4 km || 
|-id=657 bgcolor=#E9E9E9
| 40657 ||  || — || September 13, 1999 || Socorro || LINEAR || — || align=right | 6.1 km || 
|-id=658 bgcolor=#E9E9E9
| 40658 ||  || — || September 13, 1999 || Socorro || LINEAR || — || align=right | 5.1 km || 
|-id=659 bgcolor=#d6d6d6
| 40659 ||  || — || September 13, 1999 || Socorro || LINEAR || — || align=right | 7.2 km || 
|-id=660 bgcolor=#E9E9E9
| 40660 ||  || — || September 7, 1999 || Socorro || LINEAR || — || align=right | 4.8 km || 
|-id=661 bgcolor=#d6d6d6
| 40661 ||  || — || September 7, 1999 || Socorro || LINEAR || — || align=right | 13 km || 
|-id=662 bgcolor=#E9E9E9
| 40662 ||  || — || September 8, 1999 || Socorro || LINEAR || GEF || align=right | 5.4 km || 
|-id=663 bgcolor=#E9E9E9
| 40663 ||  || — || September 8, 1999 || Socorro || LINEAR || — || align=right | 4.4 km || 
|-id=664 bgcolor=#E9E9E9
| 40664 ||  || — || September 8, 1999 || Socorro || LINEAR || MAR || align=right | 3.5 km || 
|-id=665 bgcolor=#fefefe
| 40665 ||  || — || September 8, 1999 || Socorro || LINEAR || V || align=right | 1.8 km || 
|-id=666 bgcolor=#fefefe
| 40666 ||  || — || September 8, 1999 || Socorro || LINEAR || — || align=right | 2.8 km || 
|-id=667 bgcolor=#E9E9E9
| 40667 ||  || — || September 8, 1999 || Socorro || LINEAR || MAR || align=right | 5.1 km || 
|-id=668 bgcolor=#E9E9E9
| 40668 ||  || — || September 8, 1999 || Socorro || LINEAR || — || align=right | 2.5 km || 
|-id=669 bgcolor=#d6d6d6
| 40669 ||  || — || September 8, 1999 || Socorro || LINEAR || EOS || align=right | 5.2 km || 
|-id=670 bgcolor=#E9E9E9
| 40670 ||  || — || September 8, 1999 || Socorro || LINEAR || — || align=right | 5.9 km || 
|-id=671 bgcolor=#d6d6d6
| 40671 ||  || — || September 8, 1999 || Socorro || LINEAR || 629 || align=right | 5.4 km || 
|-id=672 bgcolor=#E9E9E9
| 40672 ||  || — || September 8, 1999 || Socorro || LINEAR || — || align=right | 3.5 km || 
|-id=673 bgcolor=#E9E9E9
| 40673 ||  || — || September 8, 1999 || Socorro || LINEAR || — || align=right | 4.1 km || 
|-id=674 bgcolor=#E9E9E9
| 40674 ||  || — || September 8, 1999 || Socorro || LINEAR || — || align=right | 3.6 km || 
|-id=675 bgcolor=#d6d6d6
| 40675 ||  || — || September 8, 1999 || Socorro || LINEAR || EOS || align=right | 4.8 km || 
|-id=676 bgcolor=#E9E9E9
| 40676 ||  || — || September 8, 1999 || Socorro || LINEAR || MAR || align=right | 3.3 km || 
|-id=677 bgcolor=#d6d6d6
| 40677 ||  || — || September 8, 1999 || Socorro || LINEAR || ALA || align=right | 11 km || 
|-id=678 bgcolor=#E9E9E9
| 40678 ||  || — || September 8, 1999 || Socorro || LINEAR || — || align=right | 3.3 km || 
|-id=679 bgcolor=#d6d6d6
| 40679 ||  || — || September 8, 1999 || Socorro || LINEAR || EOS || align=right | 5.1 km || 
|-id=680 bgcolor=#fefefe
| 40680 ||  || — || September 8, 1999 || Socorro || LINEAR || — || align=right | 2.6 km || 
|-id=681 bgcolor=#d6d6d6
| 40681 ||  || — || September 8, 1999 || Socorro || LINEAR || — || align=right | 9.5 km || 
|-id=682 bgcolor=#E9E9E9
| 40682 ||  || — || September 8, 1999 || Socorro || LINEAR || — || align=right | 7.6 km || 
|-id=683 bgcolor=#E9E9E9
| 40683 ||  || — || September 9, 1999 || Socorro || LINEAR || — || align=right | 4.0 km || 
|-id=684 bgcolor=#E9E9E9
| 40684 Vanhoeck ||  ||  || September 8, 1999 || Uccle || T. Pauwels || AGN || align=right | 2.5 km || 
|-id=685 bgcolor=#fefefe
| 40685 ||  || — || September 3, 1999 || Anderson Mesa || LONEOS || — || align=right | 2.7 km || 
|-id=686 bgcolor=#E9E9E9
| 40686 ||  || — || September 4, 1999 || Anderson Mesa || LONEOS || — || align=right | 6.6 km || 
|-id=687 bgcolor=#E9E9E9
| 40687 ||  || — || September 5, 1999 || Catalina || CSS || — || align=right | 4.1 km || 
|-id=688 bgcolor=#d6d6d6
| 40688 ||  || — || September 7, 1999 || Socorro || LINEAR || TEL || align=right | 5.0 km || 
|-id=689 bgcolor=#E9E9E9
| 40689 ||  || — || September 7, 1999 || Anderson Mesa || LONEOS || ADE || align=right | 6.2 km || 
|-id=690 bgcolor=#E9E9E9
| 40690 ||  || — || September 4, 1999 || Catalina || CSS || — || align=right | 2.8 km || 
|-id=691 bgcolor=#fefefe
| 40691 ||  || — || September 5, 1999 || Catalina || CSS || — || align=right | 3.5 km || 
|-id=692 bgcolor=#fefefe
| 40692 ||  || — || September 8, 1999 || Catalina || CSS || V || align=right | 3.4 km || 
|-id=693 bgcolor=#fefefe
| 40693 ||  || — || September 8, 1999 || Catalina || CSS || V || align=right | 2.0 km || 
|-id=694 bgcolor=#fefefe
| 40694 ||  || — || September 8, 1999 || Catalina || CSS || — || align=right | 4.5 km || 
|-id=695 bgcolor=#E9E9E9
| 40695 ||  || — || September 8, 1999 || Catalina || CSS || — || align=right | 2.9 km || 
|-id=696 bgcolor=#E9E9E9
| 40696 ||  || — || September 9, 1999 || Anderson Mesa || LONEOS || — || align=right | 3.2 km || 
|-id=697 bgcolor=#fefefe
| 40697 ||  || — || September 9, 1999 || Anderson Mesa || LONEOS || V || align=right | 3.0 km || 
|-id=698 bgcolor=#fefefe
| 40698 ||  || — || September 8, 1999 || Catalina || CSS || FLO || align=right | 2.3 km || 
|-id=699 bgcolor=#E9E9E9
| 40699 ||  || — || September 8, 1999 || Catalina || CSS || — || align=right | 3.9 km || 
|-id=700 bgcolor=#fefefe
| 40700 ||  || — || September 8, 1999 || Catalina || CSS || — || align=right | 2.0 km || 
|}

40701–40800 

|-bgcolor=#E9E9E9
| 40701 ||  || — || September 8, 1999 || Catalina || CSS || MRX || align=right | 3.9 km || 
|-id=702 bgcolor=#E9E9E9
| 40702 ||  || — || September 8, 1999 || Catalina || CSS || EUN || align=right | 4.3 km || 
|-id=703 bgcolor=#d6d6d6
| 40703 ||  || — || September 8, 1999 || Catalina || CSS || — || align=right | 6.4 km || 
|-id=704 bgcolor=#E9E9E9
| 40704 ||  || — || September 8, 1999 || Catalina || CSS || GEF || align=right | 3.1 km || 
|-id=705 bgcolor=#E9E9E9
| 40705 ||  || — || September 8, 1999 || Catalina || CSS || — || align=right | 6.7 km || 
|-id=706 bgcolor=#d6d6d6
| 40706 Milam ||  ||  || September 11, 1999 || Anderson Mesa || LONEOS || FIR || align=right | 10 km || 
|-id=707 bgcolor=#E9E9E9
| 40707 ||  || — || September 11, 1999 || Anderson Mesa || LONEOS || — || align=right | 3.7 km || 
|-id=708 bgcolor=#fefefe
| 40708 ||  || — || September 4, 1999 || Anderson Mesa || LONEOS || — || align=right | 3.7 km || 
|-id=709 bgcolor=#E9E9E9
| 40709 ||  || — || September 4, 1999 || Anderson Mesa || LONEOS || — || align=right | 4.5 km || 
|-id=710 bgcolor=#E9E9E9
| 40710 ||  || — || September 7, 1999 || Anderson Mesa || LONEOS || GEF || align=right | 3.7 km || 
|-id=711 bgcolor=#E9E9E9
| 40711 ||  || — || September 7, 1999 || Anderson Mesa || LONEOS || — || align=right | 2.5 km || 
|-id=712 bgcolor=#d6d6d6
| 40712 ||  || — || September 7, 1999 || Anderson Mesa || LONEOS || — || align=right | 6.8 km || 
|-id=713 bgcolor=#d6d6d6
| 40713 ||  || — || September 7, 1999 || Kitt Peak || Spacewatch || KOR || align=right | 3.2 km || 
|-id=714 bgcolor=#d6d6d6
| 40714 ||  || — || September 8, 1999 || Socorro || LINEAR || EOS || align=right | 5.2 km || 
|-id=715 bgcolor=#fefefe
| 40715 ||  || — || September 7, 1999 || Socorro || LINEAR || — || align=right | 2.0 km || 
|-id=716 bgcolor=#E9E9E9
| 40716 || 1999 SL || — || September 16, 1999 || Reedy Creek || J. Broughton || DOR || align=right | 11 km || 
|-id=717 bgcolor=#fefefe
| 40717 ||  || — || September 18, 1999 || Socorro || LINEAR || PHO || align=right | 3.9 km || 
|-id=718 bgcolor=#d6d6d6
| 40718 ||  || — || September 21, 1999 || Ondřejov || L. Kotková || HYG || align=right | 6.2 km || 
|-id=719 bgcolor=#FA8072
| 40719 ||  || — || September 29, 1999 || Socorro || LINEAR || — || align=right | 2.2 km || 
|-id=720 bgcolor=#E9E9E9
| 40720 ||  || — || September 30, 1999 || Socorro || LINEAR || — || align=right | 2.9 km || 
|-id=721 bgcolor=#E9E9E9
| 40721 ||  || — || September 30, 1999 || Socorro || LINEAR || — || align=right | 3.6 km || 
|-id=722 bgcolor=#E9E9E9
| 40722 ||  || — || September 30, 1999 || Socorro || LINEAR || — || align=right | 3.9 km || 
|-id=723 bgcolor=#E9E9E9
| 40723 ||  || — || September 29, 1999 || Socorro || LINEAR || — || align=right | 3.2 km || 
|-id=724 bgcolor=#E9E9E9
| 40724 ||  || — || September 29, 1999 || Socorro || LINEAR || EUN || align=right | 5.4 km || 
|-id=725 bgcolor=#E9E9E9
| 40725 ||  || — || September 30, 1999 || Stroncone || Santa Lucia Obs. || EUN || align=right | 3.0 km || 
|-id=726 bgcolor=#d6d6d6
| 40726 ||  || — || September 30, 1999 || Catalina || CSS || EOS || align=right | 5.7 km || 
|-id=727 bgcolor=#E9E9E9
| 40727 ||  || — || September 30, 1999 || Catalina || CSS || NEM || align=right | 6.5 km || 
|-id=728 bgcolor=#E9E9E9
| 40728 ||  || — || September 30, 1999 || Catalina || CSS || — || align=right | 3.8 km || 
|-id=729 bgcolor=#fefefe
| 40729 ||  || — || September 30, 1999 || Socorro || LINEAR || PHO || align=right | 3.9 km || 
|-id=730 bgcolor=#d6d6d6
| 40730 ||  || — || September 30, 1999 || Socorro || LINEAR || — || align=right | 10 km || 
|-id=731 bgcolor=#E9E9E9
| 40731 ||  || — || September 30, 1999 || Socorro || LINEAR || MAR || align=right | 3.8 km || 
|-id=732 bgcolor=#d6d6d6
| 40732 ||  || — || September 30, 1999 || Socorro || LINEAR || — || align=right | 13 km || 
|-id=733 bgcolor=#fefefe
| 40733 ||  || — || September 30, 1999 || Socorro || LINEAR || V || align=right | 2.8 km || 
|-id=734 bgcolor=#d6d6d6
| 40734 ||  || — || September 30, 1999 || Socorro || LINEAR || EUP || align=right | 10 km || 
|-id=735 bgcolor=#E9E9E9
| 40735 ||  || — || September 30, 1999 || Socorro || LINEAR || — || align=right | 4.1 km || 
|-id=736 bgcolor=#E9E9E9
| 40736 ||  || — || September 30, 1999 || Socorro || LINEAR || EUN || align=right | 6.4 km || 
|-id=737 bgcolor=#E9E9E9
| 40737 ||  || — || September 30, 1999 || Socorro || LINEAR || — || align=right | 3.8 km || 
|-id=738 bgcolor=#d6d6d6
| 40738 ||  || — || September 30, 1999 || Socorro || LINEAR || — || align=right | 8.9 km || 
|-id=739 bgcolor=#E9E9E9
| 40739 ||  || — || September 30, 1999 || Catalina || CSS || EUN || align=right | 4.1 km || 
|-id=740 bgcolor=#E9E9E9
| 40740 ||  || — || September 30, 1999 || Catalina || CSS || MAR || align=right | 2.6 km || 
|-id=741 bgcolor=#d6d6d6
| 40741 || 1999 TD || — || October 1, 1999 || High Point || D. K. Chesney || — || align=right | 11 km || 
|-id=742 bgcolor=#d6d6d6
| 40742 || 1999 TK || — || October 2, 1999 || Prescott || P. G. Comba || THM || align=right | 6.7 km || 
|-id=743 bgcolor=#d6d6d6
| 40743 || 1999 TL || — || October 2, 1999 || Prescott || P. G. Comba || THM || align=right | 7.2 km || 
|-id=744 bgcolor=#d6d6d6
| 40744 ||  || — || October 1, 1999 || Višnjan Observatory || K. Korlević || KOR || align=right | 4.2 km || 
|-id=745 bgcolor=#E9E9E9
| 40745 ||  || — || October 2, 1999 || Fountain Hills || C. W. Juels || EUN || align=right | 4.2 km || 
|-id=746 bgcolor=#fefefe
| 40746 ||  || — || October 2, 1999 || Fountain Hills || C. W. Juels || — || align=right | 5.2 km || 
|-id=747 bgcolor=#E9E9E9
| 40747 ||  || — || October 2, 1999 || High Point || D. K. Chesney || — || align=right | 4.3 km || 
|-id=748 bgcolor=#fefefe
| 40748 ||  || — || October 1, 1999 || Višnjan Observatory || K. Korlević, M. Jurić || — || align=right | 2.7 km || 
|-id=749 bgcolor=#d6d6d6
| 40749 ||  || — || October 6, 1999 || Višnjan Observatory || K. Korlević, M. Jurić || THM || align=right | 9.0 km || 
|-id=750 bgcolor=#fefefe
| 40750 ||  || — || October 6, 1999 || Višnjan Observatory || K. Korlević, M. Jurić || NYS || align=right | 1.6 km || 
|-id=751 bgcolor=#d6d6d6
| 40751 ||  || — || October 6, 1999 || Višnjan Observatory || K. Korlević, M. Jurić || — || align=right | 8.2 km || 
|-id=752 bgcolor=#E9E9E9
| 40752 ||  || — || October 7, 1999 || Višnjan Observatory || K. Korlević, M. Jurić || EUN || align=right | 5.1 km || 
|-id=753 bgcolor=#fefefe
| 40753 ||  || — || October 6, 1999 || Višnjan Observatory || K. Korlević, M. Jurić || — || align=right | 1.4 km || 
|-id=754 bgcolor=#d6d6d6
| 40754 ||  || — || October 6, 1999 || Višnjan Observatory || K. Korlević, M. Jurić || KOR || align=right | 3.2 km || 
|-id=755 bgcolor=#d6d6d6
| 40755 ||  || — || October 6, 1999 || Višnjan Observatory || K. Korlević, M. Jurić || KOR || align=right | 4.7 km || 
|-id=756 bgcolor=#d6d6d6
| 40756 ||  || — || October 7, 1999 || Višnjan Observatory || K. Korlević, M. Jurić || — || align=right | 9.1 km || 
|-id=757 bgcolor=#E9E9E9
| 40757 ||  || — || October 5, 1999 || Gekko || T. Kagawa || — || align=right | 2.6 km || 
|-id=758 bgcolor=#d6d6d6
| 40758 ||  || — || October 5, 1999 || Gekko || T. Kagawa || — || align=right | 8.7 km || 
|-id=759 bgcolor=#E9E9E9
| 40759 ||  || — || October 6, 1999 || Dossobuono || L. Lai || — || align=right | 4.7 km || 
|-id=760 bgcolor=#d6d6d6
| 40760 ||  || — || October 9, 1999 || Fountain Hills || C. W. Juels || — || align=right | 15 km || 
|-id=761 bgcolor=#E9E9E9
| 40761 ||  || — || October 11, 1999 || Črni Vrh || Črni Vrh || — || align=right | 5.9 km || 
|-id=762 bgcolor=#E9E9E9
| 40762 ||  || — || October 11, 1999 || Višnjan Observatory || K. Korlević, M. Jurić || — || align=right | 4.4 km || 
|-id=763 bgcolor=#d6d6d6
| 40763 Zloch ||  ||  || October 5, 1999 || Ondřejov || P. Kušnirák || — || align=right | 5.7 km || 
|-id=764 bgcolor=#d6d6d6
| 40764 Gerhardiser ||  ||  || October 13, 1999 || Starkenburg Observatory || Starkenburg Obs. || — || align=right | 5.5 km || 
|-id=765 bgcolor=#E9E9E9
| 40765 ||  || — || October 10, 1999 || Bédoin || P. Antonini || HEN || align=right | 3.7 km || 
|-id=766 bgcolor=#d6d6d6
| 40766 ||  || — || October 14, 1999 || Višnjan Observatory || K. Korlević || — || align=right | 9.6 km || 
|-id=767 bgcolor=#d6d6d6
| 40767 ||  || — || October 14, 1999 || Višnjan Observatory || K. Korlević || — || align=right | 8.8 km || 
|-id=768 bgcolor=#E9E9E9
| 40768 ||  || — || October 10, 1999 || Xinglong || SCAP || — || align=right | 3.9 km || 
|-id=769 bgcolor=#d6d6d6
| 40769 ||  || — || October 10, 1999 || Xinglong || SCAP || — || align=right | 12 km || 
|-id=770 bgcolor=#d6d6d6
| 40770 ||  || — || October 11, 1999 || Črni Vrh || Črni Vrh || — || align=right | 10 km || 
|-id=771 bgcolor=#E9E9E9
| 40771 ||  || — || October 15, 1999 || Farra d'Isonzo || Farra d'Isonzo || — || align=right | 2.7 km || 
|-id=772 bgcolor=#d6d6d6
| 40772 ||  || — || October 14, 1999 || Xinglong || SCAP || KOR || align=right | 3.8 km || 
|-id=773 bgcolor=#fefefe
| 40773 ||  || — || October 15, 1999 || Xinglong || SCAP || NYS || align=right | 1.7 km || 
|-id=774 bgcolor=#E9E9E9
| 40774 Iwaigame ||  ||  || October 11, 1999 || Nanyo || T. Okuni || — || align=right | 6.8 km || 
|-id=775 bgcolor=#E9E9E9
| 40775 Kalafina ||  ||  || October 5, 1999 || Goodricke-Pigott || R. A. Tucker || — || align=right | 7.5 km || 
|-id=776 bgcolor=#d6d6d6
| 40776 Yeungkwongyu ||  ||  || October 7, 1999 || Goodricke-Pigott || R. A. Tucker || — || align=right | 8.0 km || 
|-id=777 bgcolor=#E9E9E9
| 40777 ||  || — || October 3, 1999 || Socorro || LINEAR || — || align=right | 3.8 km || 
|-id=778 bgcolor=#d6d6d6
| 40778 ||  || — || October 3, 1999 || Socorro || LINEAR || — || align=right | 5.2 km || 
|-id=779 bgcolor=#d6d6d6
| 40779 ||  || — || October 3, 1999 || Socorro || LINEAR || URS || align=right | 5.0 km || 
|-id=780 bgcolor=#E9E9E9
| 40780 ||  || — || October 3, 1999 || Socorro || LINEAR || MRX || align=right | 3.4 km || 
|-id=781 bgcolor=#E9E9E9
| 40781 ||  || — || October 3, 1999 || Socorro || LINEAR || — || align=right | 5.0 km || 
|-id=782 bgcolor=#d6d6d6
| 40782 ||  || — || October 3, 1999 || Socorro || LINEAR || KAR || align=right | 3.2 km || 
|-id=783 bgcolor=#d6d6d6
| 40783 ||  || — || October 4, 1999 || Socorro || LINEAR || KOR || align=right | 2.8 km || 
|-id=784 bgcolor=#E9E9E9
| 40784 ||  || — || October 4, 1999 || Socorro || LINEAR || HEN || align=right | 2.9 km || 
|-id=785 bgcolor=#E9E9E9
| 40785 ||  || — || October 4, 1999 || Socorro || LINEAR || — || align=right | 3.8 km || 
|-id=786 bgcolor=#d6d6d6
| 40786 ||  || — || October 4, 1999 || Socorro || LINEAR || — || align=right | 3.3 km || 
|-id=787 bgcolor=#E9E9E9
| 40787 ||  || — || October 4, 1999 || Socorro || LINEAR || EUN || align=right | 5.1 km || 
|-id=788 bgcolor=#d6d6d6
| 40788 ||  || — || October 4, 1999 || Socorro || LINEAR || HYG || align=right | 7.6 km || 
|-id=789 bgcolor=#d6d6d6
| 40789 ||  || — || October 4, 1999 || Socorro || LINEAR || KAR || align=right | 3.4 km || 
|-id=790 bgcolor=#E9E9E9
| 40790 ||  || — || October 4, 1999 || Socorro || LINEAR || — || align=right | 2.1 km || 
|-id=791 bgcolor=#E9E9E9
| 40791 ||  || — || October 4, 1999 || Socorro || LINEAR || HEN || align=right | 3.0 km || 
|-id=792 bgcolor=#d6d6d6
| 40792 ||  || — || October 4, 1999 || Socorro || LINEAR || KOR || align=right | 2.9 km || 
|-id=793 bgcolor=#d6d6d6
| 40793 ||  || — || October 4, 1999 || Socorro || LINEAR || — || align=right | 2.6 km || 
|-id=794 bgcolor=#E9E9E9
| 40794 ||  || — || October 2, 1999 || Anderson Mesa || LONEOS || — || align=right | 3.9 km || 
|-id=795 bgcolor=#fefefe
| 40795 Akiratsuchiyama ||  ||  || October 5, 1999 || Anderson Mesa || LONEOS || V || align=right | 3.0 km || 
|-id=796 bgcolor=#E9E9E9
| 40796 ||  || — || October 13, 1999 || Anderson Mesa || LONEOS || — || align=right | 6.6 km || 
|-id=797 bgcolor=#E9E9E9
| 40797 ||  || — || October 15, 1999 || Anderson Mesa || LONEOS || — || align=right | 8.1 km || 
|-id=798 bgcolor=#E9E9E9
| 40798 ||  || — || October 1, 1999 || Catalina || CSS || — || align=right | 3.4 km || 
|-id=799 bgcolor=#E9E9E9
| 40799 ||  || — || October 1, 1999 || Catalina || CSS || — || align=right | 4.8 km || 
|-id=800 bgcolor=#fefefe
| 40800 ||  || — || October 1, 1999 || Catalina || CSS || NYS || align=right | 1.8 km || 
|}

40801–40900 

|-bgcolor=#d6d6d6
| 40801 ||  || — || October 1, 1999 || Catalina || CSS || — || align=right | 6.1 km || 
|-id=802 bgcolor=#fefefe
| 40802 ||  || — || October 3, 1999 || Catalina || CSS || — || align=right | 1.9 km || 
|-id=803 bgcolor=#E9E9E9
| 40803 ||  || — || October 3, 1999 || Catalina || CSS || ADE || align=right | 8.8 km || 
|-id=804 bgcolor=#E9E9E9
| 40804 ||  || — || October 5, 1999 || Catalina || CSS || — || align=right | 7.5 km || 
|-id=805 bgcolor=#E9E9E9
| 40805 ||  || — || October 3, 1999 || Kitt Peak || Spacewatch || — || align=right | 1.8 km || 
|-id=806 bgcolor=#fefefe
| 40806 ||  || — || October 3, 1999 || Kitt Peak || Spacewatch || NYS || align=right | 1.4 km || 
|-id=807 bgcolor=#E9E9E9
| 40807 ||  || — || October 4, 1999 || Kitt Peak || Spacewatch || — || align=right | 2.9 km || 
|-id=808 bgcolor=#E9E9E9
| 40808 ||  || — || October 6, 1999 || Kitt Peak || Spacewatch || — || align=right | 5.5 km || 
|-id=809 bgcolor=#d6d6d6
| 40809 ||  || — || October 6, 1999 || Kitt Peak || Spacewatch || URS || align=right | 5.8 km || 
|-id=810 bgcolor=#d6d6d6
| 40810 ||  || — || October 7, 1999 || Kitt Peak || Spacewatch || — || align=right | 3.5 km || 
|-id=811 bgcolor=#d6d6d6
| 40811 ||  || — || October 7, 1999 || Kitt Peak || Spacewatch || — || align=right | 7.2 km || 
|-id=812 bgcolor=#d6d6d6
| 40812 ||  || — || October 7, 1999 || Kitt Peak || Spacewatch || ANF || align=right | 3.4 km || 
|-id=813 bgcolor=#d6d6d6
| 40813 ||  || — || October 8, 1999 || Kitt Peak || Spacewatch || EOS || align=right | 5.4 km || 
|-id=814 bgcolor=#d6d6d6
| 40814 ||  || — || October 9, 1999 || Kitt Peak || Spacewatch || KOR || align=right | 3.2 km || 
|-id=815 bgcolor=#fefefe
| 40815 ||  || — || October 11, 1999 || Kitt Peak || Spacewatch || — || align=right | 3.6 km || 
|-id=816 bgcolor=#d6d6d6
| 40816 ||  || — || October 11, 1999 || Kitt Peak || Spacewatch || — || align=right | 5.9 km || 
|-id=817 bgcolor=#d6d6d6
| 40817 ||  || — || October 11, 1999 || Kitt Peak || Spacewatch || — || align=right | 6.7 km || 
|-id=818 bgcolor=#fefefe
| 40818 ||  || — || October 11, 1999 || Kitt Peak || Spacewatch || NYS || align=right | 1.5 km || 
|-id=819 bgcolor=#d6d6d6
| 40819 ||  || — || October 11, 1999 || Kitt Peak || Spacewatch || KOR || align=right | 3.5 km || 
|-id=820 bgcolor=#d6d6d6
| 40820 ||  || — || October 2, 1999 || Socorro || LINEAR || KOR || align=right | 3.5 km || 
|-id=821 bgcolor=#E9E9E9
| 40821 ||  || — || October 2, 1999 || Socorro || LINEAR || — || align=right | 3.5 km || 
|-id=822 bgcolor=#E9E9E9
| 40822 ||  || — || October 2, 1999 || Socorro || LINEAR || — || align=right | 3.8 km || 
|-id=823 bgcolor=#E9E9E9
| 40823 ||  || — || October 2, 1999 || Socorro || LINEAR || ADE || align=right | 3.9 km || 
|-id=824 bgcolor=#E9E9E9
| 40824 ||  || — || October 2, 1999 || Socorro || LINEAR || — || align=right | 5.8 km || 
|-id=825 bgcolor=#fefefe
| 40825 ||  || — || October 2, 1999 || Socorro || LINEAR || V || align=right | 2.3 km || 
|-id=826 bgcolor=#E9E9E9
| 40826 ||  || — || October 2, 1999 || Socorro || LINEAR || — || align=right | 2.9 km || 
|-id=827 bgcolor=#fefefe
| 40827 ||  || — || October 2, 1999 || Socorro || LINEAR || NYS || align=right | 5.3 km || 
|-id=828 bgcolor=#E9E9E9
| 40828 ||  || — || October 2, 1999 || Socorro || LINEAR || — || align=right | 6.3 km || 
|-id=829 bgcolor=#E9E9E9
| 40829 ||  || — || October 2, 1999 || Socorro || LINEAR || — || align=right | 4.4 km || 
|-id=830 bgcolor=#fefefe
| 40830 ||  || — || October 2, 1999 || Socorro || LINEAR || NYS || align=right | 5.1 km || 
|-id=831 bgcolor=#E9E9E9
| 40831 ||  || — || October 2, 1999 || Socorro || LINEAR || — || align=right | 3.5 km || 
|-id=832 bgcolor=#E9E9E9
| 40832 ||  || — || October 2, 1999 || Socorro || LINEAR || — || align=right | 5.8 km || 
|-id=833 bgcolor=#d6d6d6
| 40833 ||  || — || October 2, 1999 || Socorro || LINEAR || — || align=right | 5.5 km || 
|-id=834 bgcolor=#E9E9E9
| 40834 ||  || — || October 2, 1999 || Socorro || LINEAR || — || align=right | 3.8 km || 
|-id=835 bgcolor=#E9E9E9
| 40835 ||  || — || October 2, 1999 || Socorro || LINEAR || — || align=right | 5.1 km || 
|-id=836 bgcolor=#d6d6d6
| 40836 ||  || — || October 2, 1999 || Socorro || LINEAR || — || align=right | 7.9 km || 
|-id=837 bgcolor=#E9E9E9
| 40837 ||  || — || October 2, 1999 || Socorro || LINEAR || HEN || align=right | 2.9 km || 
|-id=838 bgcolor=#E9E9E9
| 40838 ||  || — || October 2, 1999 || Socorro || LINEAR || MRX || align=right | 5.9 km || 
|-id=839 bgcolor=#E9E9E9
| 40839 ||  || — || October 2, 1999 || Socorro || LINEAR || AGN || align=right | 3.0 km || 
|-id=840 bgcolor=#d6d6d6
| 40840 ||  || — || October 2, 1999 || Socorro || LINEAR || EOS || align=right | 6.4 km || 
|-id=841 bgcolor=#E9E9E9
| 40841 ||  || — || October 2, 1999 || Socorro || LINEAR || GEF || align=right | 4.5 km || 
|-id=842 bgcolor=#E9E9E9
| 40842 ||  || — || October 2, 1999 || Socorro || LINEAR || — || align=right | 4.6 km || 
|-id=843 bgcolor=#fefefe
| 40843 ||  || — || October 2, 1999 || Socorro || LINEAR || — || align=right | 2.2 km || 
|-id=844 bgcolor=#E9E9E9
| 40844 ||  || — || October 2, 1999 || Socorro || LINEAR || — || align=right | 4.4 km || 
|-id=845 bgcolor=#fefefe
| 40845 ||  || — || October 2, 1999 || Socorro || LINEAR || — || align=right | 4.9 km || 
|-id=846 bgcolor=#E9E9E9
| 40846 ||  || — || October 2, 1999 || Socorro || LINEAR || — || align=right | 2.6 km || 
|-id=847 bgcolor=#d6d6d6
| 40847 ||  || — || October 2, 1999 || Socorro || LINEAR || — || align=right | 10 km || 
|-id=848 bgcolor=#E9E9E9
| 40848 ||  || — || October 2, 1999 || Socorro || LINEAR || — || align=right | 4.3 km || 
|-id=849 bgcolor=#E9E9E9
| 40849 ||  || — || October 2, 1999 || Socorro || LINEAR || — || align=right | 3.5 km || 
|-id=850 bgcolor=#d6d6d6
| 40850 ||  || — || October 3, 1999 || Socorro || LINEAR || — || align=right | 7.4 km || 
|-id=851 bgcolor=#E9E9E9
| 40851 ||  || — || October 3, 1999 || Socorro || LINEAR || — || align=right | 3.3 km || 
|-id=852 bgcolor=#d6d6d6
| 40852 ||  || — || October 3, 1999 || Socorro || LINEAR || TRP || align=right | 8.4 km || 
|-id=853 bgcolor=#E9E9E9
| 40853 ||  || — || October 4, 1999 || Socorro || LINEAR || GAL || align=right | 4.7 km || 
|-id=854 bgcolor=#E9E9E9
| 40854 ||  || — || October 4, 1999 || Socorro || LINEAR || EUN || align=right | 4.3 km || 
|-id=855 bgcolor=#d6d6d6
| 40855 ||  || — || October 4, 1999 || Socorro || LINEAR || EOS || align=right | 6.9 km || 
|-id=856 bgcolor=#fefefe
| 40856 ||  || — || October 4, 1999 || Socorro || LINEAR || — || align=right | 4.8 km || 
|-id=857 bgcolor=#E9E9E9
| 40857 ||  || — || October 4, 1999 || Socorro || LINEAR || — || align=right | 4.4 km || 
|-id=858 bgcolor=#E9E9E9
| 40858 ||  || — || October 4, 1999 || Socorro || LINEAR || — || align=right | 5.7 km || 
|-id=859 bgcolor=#E9E9E9
| 40859 ||  || — || October 4, 1999 || Socorro || LINEAR || — || align=right | 5.7 km || 
|-id=860 bgcolor=#E9E9E9
| 40860 ||  || — || October 4, 1999 || Socorro || LINEAR || — || align=right | 5.5 km || 
|-id=861 bgcolor=#E9E9E9
| 40861 ||  || — || October 4, 1999 || Socorro || LINEAR || WIT || align=right | 2.6 km || 
|-id=862 bgcolor=#d6d6d6
| 40862 ||  || — || October 4, 1999 || Socorro || LINEAR || — || align=right | 7.7 km || 
|-id=863 bgcolor=#E9E9E9
| 40863 ||  || — || October 4, 1999 || Socorro || LINEAR || — || align=right | 3.1 km || 
|-id=864 bgcolor=#d6d6d6
| 40864 ||  || — || October 4, 1999 || Socorro || LINEAR || EOS || align=right | 6.2 km || 
|-id=865 bgcolor=#E9E9E9
| 40865 ||  || — || October 4, 1999 || Socorro || LINEAR || HEN || align=right | 2.8 km || 
|-id=866 bgcolor=#E9E9E9
| 40866 ||  || — || October 4, 1999 || Socorro || LINEAR || — || align=right | 3.9 km || 
|-id=867 bgcolor=#E9E9E9
| 40867 ||  || — || October 4, 1999 || Socorro || LINEAR || — || align=right | 3.4 km || 
|-id=868 bgcolor=#E9E9E9
| 40868 ||  || — || October 4, 1999 || Socorro || LINEAR || — || align=right | 3.0 km || 
|-id=869 bgcolor=#E9E9E9
| 40869 ||  || — || October 4, 1999 || Socorro || LINEAR || — || align=right | 3.6 km || 
|-id=870 bgcolor=#E9E9E9
| 40870 ||  || — || October 4, 1999 || Socorro || LINEAR || — || align=right | 4.3 km || 
|-id=871 bgcolor=#E9E9E9
| 40871 ||  || — || October 4, 1999 || Socorro || LINEAR || — || align=right | 3.8 km || 
|-id=872 bgcolor=#d6d6d6
| 40872 ||  || — || October 4, 1999 || Socorro || LINEAR || THM || align=right | 8.1 km || 
|-id=873 bgcolor=#E9E9E9
| 40873 ||  || — || October 4, 1999 || Socorro || LINEAR || HEN || align=right | 3.1 km || 
|-id=874 bgcolor=#fefefe
| 40874 ||  || — || October 4, 1999 || Socorro || LINEAR || NYS || align=right | 1.8 km || 
|-id=875 bgcolor=#E9E9E9
| 40875 ||  || — || October 4, 1999 || Socorro || LINEAR || — || align=right | 3.0 km || 
|-id=876 bgcolor=#E9E9E9
| 40876 ||  || — || October 4, 1999 || Socorro || LINEAR || AGN || align=right | 2.7 km || 
|-id=877 bgcolor=#E9E9E9
| 40877 ||  || — || October 15, 1999 || Socorro || LINEAR || — || align=right | 5.0 km || 
|-id=878 bgcolor=#E9E9E9
| 40878 ||  || — || October 4, 1999 || Socorro || LINEAR || — || align=right | 3.2 km || 
|-id=879 bgcolor=#fefefe
| 40879 ||  || — || October 4, 1999 || Socorro || LINEAR || V || align=right | 2.0 km || 
|-id=880 bgcolor=#E9E9E9
| 40880 ||  || — || October 4, 1999 || Socorro || LINEAR || — || align=right | 5.0 km || 
|-id=881 bgcolor=#E9E9E9
| 40881 ||  || — || October 4, 1999 || Socorro || LINEAR || — || align=right | 2.4 km || 
|-id=882 bgcolor=#d6d6d6
| 40882 ||  || — || October 4, 1999 || Socorro || LINEAR || — || align=right | 7.3 km || 
|-id=883 bgcolor=#E9E9E9
| 40883 ||  || — || October 4, 1999 || Socorro || LINEAR || — || align=right | 5.4 km || 
|-id=884 bgcolor=#E9E9E9
| 40884 ||  || — || October 4, 1999 || Socorro || LINEAR || — || align=right | 2.0 km || 
|-id=885 bgcolor=#d6d6d6
| 40885 ||  || — || October 4, 1999 || Socorro || LINEAR || — || align=right | 6.2 km || 
|-id=886 bgcolor=#E9E9E9
| 40886 ||  || — || October 4, 1999 || Socorro || LINEAR || — || align=right | 2.3 km || 
|-id=887 bgcolor=#d6d6d6
| 40887 ||  || — || October 4, 1999 || Socorro || LINEAR || KOR || align=right | 3.6 km || 
|-id=888 bgcolor=#d6d6d6
| 40888 ||  || — || October 6, 1999 || Socorro || LINEAR || KOR || align=right | 2.6 km || 
|-id=889 bgcolor=#E9E9E9
| 40889 ||  || — || October 6, 1999 || Socorro || LINEAR || HEN || align=right | 2.3 km || 
|-id=890 bgcolor=#d6d6d6
| 40890 ||  || — || October 6, 1999 || Socorro || LINEAR || — || align=right | 7.5 km || 
|-id=891 bgcolor=#E9E9E9
| 40891 ||  || — || October 6, 1999 || Socorro || LINEAR || — || align=right | 3.3 km || 
|-id=892 bgcolor=#d6d6d6
| 40892 ||  || — || October 6, 1999 || Socorro || LINEAR || HYG || align=right | 6.2 km || 
|-id=893 bgcolor=#E9E9E9
| 40893 ||  || — || October 6, 1999 || Socorro || LINEAR || AGNslow || align=right | 3.4 km || 
|-id=894 bgcolor=#E9E9E9
| 40894 ||  || — || October 6, 1999 || Socorro || LINEAR || — || align=right | 1.7 km || 
|-id=895 bgcolor=#E9E9E9
| 40895 ||  || — || October 6, 1999 || Socorro || LINEAR || — || align=right | 4.6 km || 
|-id=896 bgcolor=#E9E9E9
| 40896 ||  || — || October 6, 1999 || Socorro || LINEAR || HEN || align=right | 2.0 km || 
|-id=897 bgcolor=#E9E9E9
| 40897 ||  || — || October 7, 1999 || Socorro || LINEAR || — || align=right | 3.3 km || 
|-id=898 bgcolor=#E9E9E9
| 40898 ||  || — || October 7, 1999 || Socorro || LINEAR || — || align=right | 2.9 km || 
|-id=899 bgcolor=#E9E9E9
| 40899 ||  || — || October 7, 1999 || Socorro || LINEAR || — || align=right | 3.4 km || 
|-id=900 bgcolor=#d6d6d6
| 40900 ||  || — || October 7, 1999 || Socorro || LINEAR || — || align=right | 5.3 km || 
|}

40901–41000 

|-bgcolor=#E9E9E9
| 40901 ||  || — || October 7, 1999 || Socorro || LINEAR || — || align=right | 8.4 km || 
|-id=902 bgcolor=#E9E9E9
| 40902 ||  || — || October 7, 1999 || Socorro || LINEAR || — || align=right | 6.4 km || 
|-id=903 bgcolor=#E9E9E9
| 40903 ||  || — || October 7, 1999 || Socorro || LINEAR || GEF || align=right | 4.3 km || 
|-id=904 bgcolor=#E9E9E9
| 40904 ||  || — || October 7, 1999 || Socorro || LINEAR || — || align=right | 2.1 km || 
|-id=905 bgcolor=#d6d6d6
| 40905 ||  || — || October 7, 1999 || Socorro || LINEAR || — || align=right | 7.4 km || 
|-id=906 bgcolor=#d6d6d6
| 40906 ||  || — || October 7, 1999 || Socorro || LINEAR || BRA || align=right | 5.4 km || 
|-id=907 bgcolor=#d6d6d6
| 40907 ||  || — || October 7, 1999 || Socorro || LINEAR || — || align=right | 5.5 km || 
|-id=908 bgcolor=#E9E9E9
| 40908 ||  || — || October 7, 1999 || Socorro || LINEAR || — || align=right | 3.9 km || 
|-id=909 bgcolor=#E9E9E9
| 40909 ||  || — || October 7, 1999 || Socorro || LINEAR || — || align=right | 6.7 km || 
|-id=910 bgcolor=#fefefe
| 40910 ||  || — || October 7, 1999 || Socorro || LINEAR || NYS || align=right | 1.7 km || 
|-id=911 bgcolor=#E9E9E9
| 40911 ||  || — || October 7, 1999 || Socorro || LINEAR || — || align=right | 2.8 km || 
|-id=912 bgcolor=#d6d6d6
| 40912 ||  || — || October 7, 1999 || Socorro || LINEAR || — || align=right | 11 km || 
|-id=913 bgcolor=#E9E9E9
| 40913 ||  || — || October 7, 1999 || Socorro || LINEAR || — || align=right | 2.1 km || 
|-id=914 bgcolor=#E9E9E9
| 40914 ||  || — || October 7, 1999 || Socorro || LINEAR || — || align=right | 5.7 km || 
|-id=915 bgcolor=#E9E9E9
| 40915 ||  || — || October 7, 1999 || Socorro || LINEAR || PAD || align=right | 6.4 km || 
|-id=916 bgcolor=#d6d6d6
| 40916 ||  || — || October 7, 1999 || Socorro || LINEAR || EOS || align=right | 6.1 km || 
|-id=917 bgcolor=#d6d6d6
| 40917 Pauljorden ||  ||  || October 9, 1999 || Socorro || LINEAR || HYG || align=right | 7.1 km || 
|-id=918 bgcolor=#d6d6d6
| 40918 ||  || — || October 7, 1999 || Socorro || LINEAR || — || align=right | 7.2 km || 
|-id=919 bgcolor=#E9E9E9
| 40919 Johntonry ||  ||  || October 9, 1999 || Socorro || LINEAR || — || align=right | 2.5 km || 
|-id=920 bgcolor=#d6d6d6
| 40920 ||  || — || October 10, 1999 || Socorro || LINEAR || KOR || align=right | 3.5 km || 
|-id=921 bgcolor=#d6d6d6
| 40921 ||  || — || October 10, 1999 || Socorro || LINEAR || KAR || align=right | 3.5 km || 
|-id=922 bgcolor=#E9E9E9
| 40922 ||  || — || October 10, 1999 || Socorro || LINEAR || PAD || align=right | 6.1 km || 
|-id=923 bgcolor=#d6d6d6
| 40923 ||  || — || October 10, 1999 || Socorro || LINEAR || EOS || align=right | 5.7 km || 
|-id=924 bgcolor=#d6d6d6
| 40924 ||  || — || October 10, 1999 || Socorro || LINEAR || EOS || align=right | 5.4 km || 
|-id=925 bgcolor=#E9E9E9
| 40925 ||  || — || October 10, 1999 || Socorro || LINEAR || — || align=right | 2.1 km || 
|-id=926 bgcolor=#E9E9E9
| 40926 ||  || — || October 10, 1999 || Socorro || LINEAR || — || align=right | 5.3 km || 
|-id=927 bgcolor=#E9E9E9
| 40927 ||  || — || October 12, 1999 || Socorro || LINEAR || ADE || align=right | 7.1 km || 
|-id=928 bgcolor=#d6d6d6
| 40928 ||  || — || October 12, 1999 || Socorro || LINEAR || — || align=right | 7.6 km || 
|-id=929 bgcolor=#d6d6d6
| 40929 ||  || — || October 12, 1999 || Socorro || LINEAR || — || align=right | 4.8 km || 
|-id=930 bgcolor=#d6d6d6
| 40930 ||  || — || October 12, 1999 || Socorro || LINEAR || — || align=right | 8.3 km || 
|-id=931 bgcolor=#E9E9E9
| 40931 ||  || — || October 12, 1999 || Socorro || LINEAR || — || align=right | 2.8 km || 
|-id=932 bgcolor=#d6d6d6
| 40932 ||  || — || October 12, 1999 || Socorro || LINEAR || EOS || align=right | 6.2 km || 
|-id=933 bgcolor=#d6d6d6
| 40933 ||  || — || October 12, 1999 || Socorro || LINEAR || — || align=right | 9.7 km || 
|-id=934 bgcolor=#E9E9E9
| 40934 ||  || — || October 12, 1999 || Socorro || LINEAR || GEF || align=right | 4.9 km || 
|-id=935 bgcolor=#d6d6d6
| 40935 ||  || — || October 12, 1999 || Socorro || LINEAR || — || align=right | 7.5 km || 
|-id=936 bgcolor=#fefefe
| 40936 ||  || — || October 13, 1999 || Socorro || LINEAR || — || align=right | 1.9 km || 
|-id=937 bgcolor=#fefefe
| 40937 ||  || — || October 13, 1999 || Socorro || LINEAR || — || align=right | 2.0 km || 
|-id=938 bgcolor=#E9E9E9
| 40938 ||  || — || October 13, 1999 || Socorro || LINEAR || AGN || align=right | 3.7 km || 
|-id=939 bgcolor=#d6d6d6
| 40939 ||  || — || October 14, 1999 || Socorro || LINEAR || EOS || align=right | 4.7 km || 
|-id=940 bgcolor=#d6d6d6
| 40940 ||  || — || October 14, 1999 || Socorro || LINEAR || — || align=right | 12 km || 
|-id=941 bgcolor=#E9E9E9
| 40941 ||  || — || October 15, 1999 || Socorro || LINEAR || — || align=right | 5.4 km || 
|-id=942 bgcolor=#E9E9E9
| 40942 ||  || — || October 15, 1999 || Socorro || LINEAR || — || align=right | 4.7 km || 
|-id=943 bgcolor=#d6d6d6
| 40943 ||  || — || October 15, 1999 || Socorro || LINEAR || KOR || align=right | 3.2 km || 
|-id=944 bgcolor=#d6d6d6
| 40944 ||  || — || October 15, 1999 || Socorro || LINEAR || KOR || align=right | 4.0 km || 
|-id=945 bgcolor=#E9E9E9
| 40945 ||  || — || October 15, 1999 || Socorro || LINEAR || VIB || align=right | 7.0 km || 
|-id=946 bgcolor=#E9E9E9
| 40946 ||  || — || October 15, 1999 || Socorro || LINEAR || — || align=right | 2.3 km || 
|-id=947 bgcolor=#E9E9E9
| 40947 ||  || — || October 15, 1999 || Socorro || LINEAR || — || align=right | 2.8 km || 
|-id=948 bgcolor=#d6d6d6
| 40948 ||  || — || October 2, 1999 || Socorro || LINEAR || KOR || align=right | 3.2 km || 
|-id=949 bgcolor=#E9E9E9
| 40949 ||  || — || October 2, 1999 || Catalina || CSS || — || align=right | 5.9 km || 
|-id=950 bgcolor=#d6d6d6
| 40950 ||  || — || October 5, 1999 || Catalina || CSS || — || align=right | 8.0 km || 
|-id=951 bgcolor=#d6d6d6
| 40951 ||  || — || October 4, 1999 || Anderson Mesa || LONEOS || — || align=right | 6.3 km || 
|-id=952 bgcolor=#E9E9E9
| 40952 ||  || — || October 5, 1999 || Catalina || CSS || PAD || align=right | 4.9 km || 
|-id=953 bgcolor=#E9E9E9
| 40953 ||  || — || October 3, 1999 || Catalina || CSS || — || align=right | 2.3 km || 
|-id=954 bgcolor=#d6d6d6
| 40954 ||  || — || October 4, 1999 || Catalina || CSS || 628 || align=right | 5.7 km || 
|-id=955 bgcolor=#E9E9E9
| 40955 ||  || — || October 4, 1999 || Catalina || CSS || DOR || align=right | 8.4 km || 
|-id=956 bgcolor=#E9E9E9
| 40956 Ericamsel ||  ||  || October 4, 1999 || Catalina || CSS || KRM || align=right | 6.2 km || 
|-id=957 bgcolor=#d6d6d6
| 40957 ||  || — || October 4, 1999 || Catalina || CSS || EOS || align=right | 5.6 km || 
|-id=958 bgcolor=#E9E9E9
| 40958 ||  || — || October 4, 1999 || Catalina || CSS || — || align=right | 3.1 km || 
|-id=959 bgcolor=#d6d6d6
| 40959 ||  || — || October 4, 1999 || Anderson Mesa || LONEOS || — || align=right | 13 km || 
|-id=960 bgcolor=#d6d6d6
| 40960 ||  || — || October 7, 1999 || Catalina || CSS || — || align=right | 5.7 km || 
|-id=961 bgcolor=#E9E9E9
| 40961 ||  || — || October 8, 1999 || Catalina || CSS || — || align=right | 5.9 km || 
|-id=962 bgcolor=#d6d6d6
| 40962 ||  || — || October 8, 1999 || Catalina || CSS || HYG || align=right | 9.9 km || 
|-id=963 bgcolor=#d6d6d6
| 40963 ||  || — || October 8, 1999 || Catalina || CSS || — || align=right | 11 km || 
|-id=964 bgcolor=#d6d6d6
| 40964 ||  || — || October 8, 1999 || Catalina || CSS || — || align=right | 8.4 km || 
|-id=965 bgcolor=#E9E9E9
| 40965 ||  || — || October 9, 1999 || Catalina || CSS || — || align=right | 3.1 km || 
|-id=966 bgcolor=#E9E9E9
| 40966 ||  || — || October 9, 1999 || Catalina || CSS || — || align=right | 5.8 km || 
|-id=967 bgcolor=#d6d6d6
| 40967 ||  || — || October 5, 1999 || Socorro || LINEAR || — || align=right | 9.1 km || 
|-id=968 bgcolor=#E9E9E9
| 40968 ||  || — || October 8, 1999 || Socorro || LINEAR || — || align=right | 3.7 km || 
|-id=969 bgcolor=#E9E9E9
| 40969 ||  || — || October 9, 1999 || Socorro || LINEAR || — || align=right | 2.6 km || 
|-id=970 bgcolor=#E9E9E9
| 40970 ||  || — || October 14, 1999 || Anderson Mesa || LONEOS || — || align=right | 8.0 km || 
|-id=971 bgcolor=#E9E9E9
| 40971 ||  || — || October 3, 1999 || Socorro || LINEAR || HNS || align=right | 3.6 km || 
|-id=972 bgcolor=#d6d6d6
| 40972 ||  || — || October 3, 1999 || Socorro || LINEAR || — || align=right | 9.0 km || 
|-id=973 bgcolor=#d6d6d6
| 40973 ||  || — || October 3, 1999 || Socorro || LINEAR || EOS || align=right | 4.0 km || 
|-id=974 bgcolor=#d6d6d6
| 40974 ||  || — || October 3, 1999 || Socorro || LINEAR || — || align=right | 7.5 km || 
|-id=975 bgcolor=#d6d6d6
| 40975 ||  || — || October 3, 1999 || Socorro || LINEAR || — || align=right | 4.6 km || 
|-id=976 bgcolor=#d6d6d6
| 40976 ||  || — || October 3, 1999 || Socorro || LINEAR || LIX || align=right | 12 km || 
|-id=977 bgcolor=#d6d6d6
| 40977 ||  || — || October 7, 1999 || Socorro || LINEAR || EOS || align=right | 4.3 km || 
|-id=978 bgcolor=#E9E9E9
| 40978 ||  || — || October 7, 1999 || Socorro || LINEAR || HNS || align=right | 2.7 km || 
|-id=979 bgcolor=#E9E9E9
| 40979 ||  || — || October 8, 1999 || Socorro || LINEAR || — || align=right | 3.1 km || 
|-id=980 bgcolor=#d6d6d6
| 40980 ||  || — || October 9, 1999 || Socorro || LINEAR || — || align=right | 4.8 km || 
|-id=981 bgcolor=#E9E9E9
| 40981 Stephenholland ||  ||  || October 9, 1999 || Socorro || LINEAR || — || align=right | 5.6 km || 
|-id=982 bgcolor=#d6d6d6
| 40982 ||  || — || October 10, 1999 || Socorro || LINEAR || — || align=right | 4.3 km || 
|-id=983 bgcolor=#E9E9E9
| 40983 ||  || — || October 10, 1999 || Socorro || LINEAR || MAR || align=right | 2.9 km || 
|-id=984 bgcolor=#d6d6d6
| 40984 ||  || — || October 10, 1999 || Socorro || LINEAR || EOS || align=right | 4.8 km || 
|-id=985 bgcolor=#d6d6d6
| 40985 ||  || — || October 10, 1999 || Socorro || LINEAR || THM || align=right | 8.0 km || 
|-id=986 bgcolor=#d6d6d6
| 40986 ||  || — || October 12, 1999 || Socorro || LINEAR || — || align=right | 3.6 km || 
|-id=987 bgcolor=#d6d6d6
| 40987 ||  || — || October 12, 1999 || Socorro || LINEAR || EOS || align=right | 4.9 km || 
|-id=988 bgcolor=#d6d6d6
| 40988 ||  || — || October 7, 1999 || Catalina || CSS || — || align=right | 6.4 km || 
|-id=989 bgcolor=#d6d6d6
| 40989 || 1999 UO || — || October 16, 1999 || Višnjan Observatory || K. Korlević || — || align=right | 6.1 km || 
|-id=990 bgcolor=#E9E9E9
| 40990 || 1999 UW || — || October 16, 1999 || Višnjan Observatory || K. Korlević || HEN || align=right | 3.4 km || 
|-id=991 bgcolor=#fefefe
| 40991 ||  || — || October 16, 1999 || Višnjan Observatory || K. Korlević || — || align=right | 2.1 km || 
|-id=992 bgcolor=#d6d6d6
| 40992 ||  || — || October 18, 1999 || High Point || D. K. Chesney || — || align=right | 7.6 km || 
|-id=993 bgcolor=#E9E9E9
| 40993 ||  || — || October 16, 1999 || Višnjan Observatory || K. Korlević || — || align=right | 3.3 km || 
|-id=994 bgcolor=#E9E9E9
| 40994 Tekaridake ||  ||  || October 20, 1999 || Mishima || M. Akiyama || EUN || align=right | 4.6 km || 
|-id=995 bgcolor=#fefefe
| 40995 ||  || — || October 27, 1999 || Starkenburg Observatory || Starkenburg Obs. || — || align=right | 2.6 km || 
|-id=996 bgcolor=#E9E9E9
| 40996 ||  || — || October 28, 1999 || Catalina || CSS || — || align=right | 3.4 km || 
|-id=997 bgcolor=#E9E9E9
| 40997 ||  || — || October 27, 1999 || Xinglong || SCAP || — || align=right | 5.2 km || 
|-id=998 bgcolor=#E9E9E9
| 40998 ||  || — || October 29, 1999 || Catalina || CSS || — || align=right | 9.3 km || 
|-id=999 bgcolor=#E9E9E9
| 40999 ||  || — || October 29, 1999 || Catalina || CSS || — || align=right | 4.9 km || 
|-id=000 bgcolor=#E9E9E9
| 41000 ||  || — || October 29, 1999 || Catalina || CSS || HOF || align=right | 7.4 km || 
|}

References

External links 
 Discovery Circumstances: Numbered Minor Planets (40001)–(45000) (IAU Minor Planet Center)

0040